= Establishment of breastfeeding =

Initiation of breast milk production

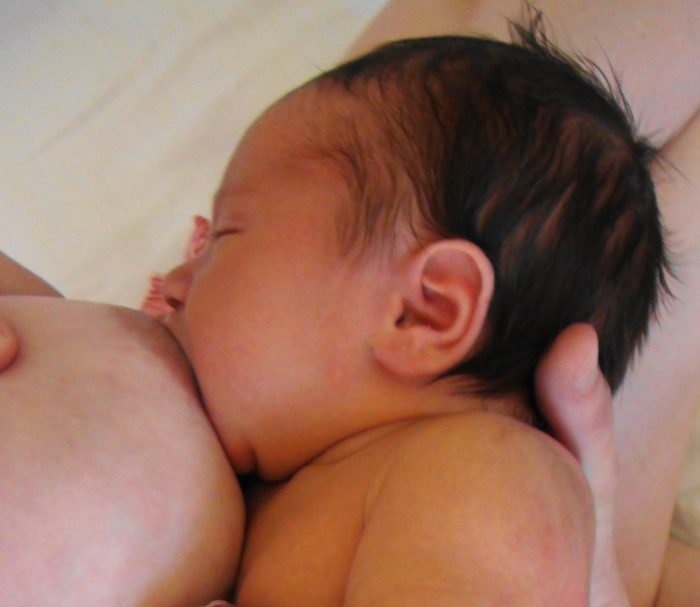
An infant receiving breastfeeding

Establishment of breastfeeding refers to the initiation of the provision of breast milk from a lactating woman to an infant. According to the World Health Organization(WHO), breastfeeding is the best way to provide nourishment, including essential nutrients, energy and antibodies, to infants and toddlers. The start of breastfeeding is supported by the milk production which depends on the development of internal and external breast structure and hormonal control on milk secretion. Besides milk supply, adopting the correct approach of breastfeeding helps build up the maternal bond, which in turn promotes breastfeeding. Not only does nursing strengthen the mother-child relationship, but it also improves the intelligence and immunity of breastfed children and diminishes breastfeeding mothers' risks to have ovarian and breast cancer.

After establishing breastfeeding, it is crucial to ensure a constant milk supply to infants. To maintain milk production, postpartum mothers are recommended to have various food and remedies, providing minerals and vitamins for infants' growth and mothers' recovery. For example, vitamin D is instrumental for infants' bones and skeletal muscles development. Concerning the regimens promoting milk supply, the western one suggests herbal tea drinking while the eastern one advises massaging various acupuncture points.

However, activities reducing the quality of breast milk, such as alcohol drinking and smoking, should be avoided for infant's health. Additionally, mothers with diseases interfering breastfeeding, such as mastitis, are suggested to seek professional medical assistance instead of following conventional remedies to ameliorate nursing difficulties.

== Anatomical significance of breast ==
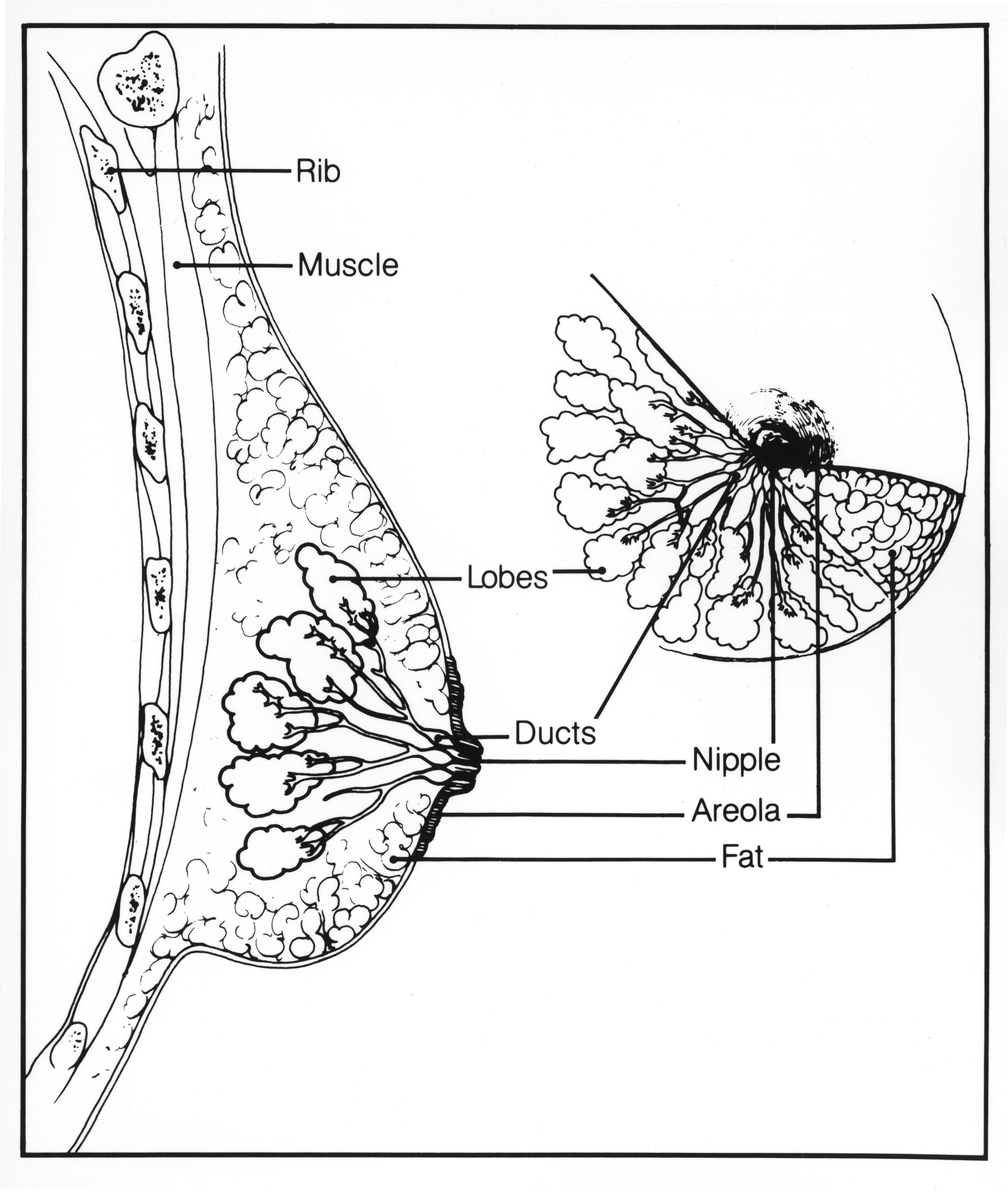
Structure of human breast

A breast is mainly composed of the glandular and adipose (fatty) tissues which are linked together by ligaments.

Concerning the structure of glandular tissue, it is composed of ducts and alveoli. These alveoli are small hollow cavities that cluster together to form lobules. These lobules further clump together to form lobes that are responsible for the production and storage of milk. The alveolar cells have their linings consisting of muscle cells, which plays a vital role in the ejection of milk by contracting the lobes during lactation. Subsequently, the already-made milk is drained outside through the ducts connecting the milk-secreting lobes and nipple.

Regarding the adipose tissue present between lobes, it is important for the alveolar growth and ductal development in the mammary gland. The maturation of alveolar cells is supported by white adipose tissue and brown adipose tissue in breast, preparing the alveoli for milk synthesis during lactation. The growth of ductal epithelium is stimulated by leptin, a hormone secreted by mature breast fatty tissue, to make the milk ducts ready for the passage of milk.

Apart from the internal structures, the external features of the breast are also involved in breastfeeding. Nipples are supplied with milk ducts, muscle and nerve fibres. The pigmented circular area surrounding the nipples is the areola containing Montgomery's glands that synthesized sebum. The function of this sebaceous fluid is to protect the skin of the nipples and areolar by reducing frictions during breastfeeding. Not only does the fluid lubricates to ensure a smooth feeding, but it also releases a salient fragrance to entice the baby to approach the breast to initiate feeding.

== Mechanism of breast milk supply ==
The mechanism of milk supply is mainly controlled by three hormones, prolactin, oxytocin, and feedback inhibitor of lactation.

=== Prolactin ===
Prolactin, produced in the anterior lobe of the pituitary gland, is the major hormone responsible for milk production. During pregnancy, the level of prolactin rises to trigger the development of mammary tissue in the breast to prepare it for milk supply. Yet, due to high levels of progesterone and oestrogen, which are female hormones released from the placenta, milk production is prohibited until the removal of the placenta after labour. When the inhibition from progesterone and oestrogen fades, prolactin can be increased to stimulate the production of milk which is stored in the myoepithelium of the mammary gland. In addition, the suckling action of the babies stimulates nipples, resulting in the secretion of prolactin. The prolactin hormone will reach its highest level in blood approximately 90 minutes after breastfeeding, preparing milk for the next feeding.

=== Oxytocin ===
Chemical structure of oxytocin

Oxytocin, released by the posterior lobe of the pituitary, is so-called the 'let-down' hormone that induces the ejection of milk stored in breast. This hormone is secreted depending on the mothers' sensations and thoughts. For instance, the suckling action of a child and the crying of a baby can promote the rapid increase of maternal oxytocin. During breastfeeding, oxytocin triggers the ejection of milk by contracting the myoepithelium surrounding alveoli in the mammary gland.

=== Feedback Inhibitor of Lactation (FIL) ===
In contrast to prolactin and oxytocin, FIL poses an inhibitory effect on milk synthesis. It gradually reduces the amount of milk produced by suspending the milk secretion when the frequency of breastfeeding is lowered. This guarantees the production of a proper volume of milk, thereby avoiding overfilling the breast with milk. In short, the level of FIL rises during the accumulation of milk to slow down milk secretion. While breast is emptier, FIL level drops to allow the milk production.

== Process of breastfeeding ==
Breastfeeding is a skill both mother and baby must learn. Good breastfeeding techniques can make establishing, maintaining, and weaning easier, more enjoyable, and reduce discomfort or complications.

=== Before breastfeeding ===
Wear comfortable, accessible clothing such as a top that unbuttons easily. Find a comfortable, safe, relaxing position and environment for mother and baby. This may be facilitated by the use of pillows, a chair or bed, footstool, or other aids. Gather everything needed during a breastfeeding session and place them within reach. Helpful items may include a drink, snacks, burp cloths, or entertainment such as a book or the tv remote.

To encourage let-down (milk ejection reflex) a mother may warm her breasts with warm cloth for example. She can use gentle stimulation techniques such as softly rolling her nipples between her fingers, softly massaging her breasts towards the nipple. Relaxing, focusing on her baby and not her letdown, and following a routine can also help.

There is no need to clean the breasts before feeding. Only wash breasts with soap and water when bathing or showering. Air dry or gently pat dry with a towel after showering, nipples do not need ‘toughening up’.

=== During and after breastfeeding ===
During breastfeeding babies may be held in many different positions such as; cradle hold, cross cradle, reclined/lying back, football/clutch hold, or side lying. Mothers may sit, stand, or lay down to feed. The best position is one that’s comfortable for both mother and baby, and facilitates a good latch and milk transfer.

Spitting up or milk regurgitation is common in babies and infants, it usually resolves by 6-12 months old and causes no discomfort. Babies have weak esophogeal sphincters, a liquid diet, and spend much of their time lying down allowing the stomach contents to rise back up. Babies may swallow air during feeding due to overactive let-down or poor latch, which may force some milk up as they burp. They may also have medical issues such as structural differences, being born premature, or having an allergy to a food or supplement the mother consumes such as dairy as seen in a cows milk protein allergy (CMPA). Some babies or infants have frequent and painful regurgitation, and maybe diagnosed with gastroesophogeal reflux disease (GORD). It may help to reduce regurgitation by feeding the infant in a position where their head is above their stomach (i.e. cradle or cross cradle), and hold them upright for 15-20 or so minutes after feeding. Burping during feeds, reducing pressure on stomachs (i.e from tight clothing or nappies), and giving smaller, more frequent feeds may help. Medical treatment may also be sought, medications such as antacids or proton pump inhibitors may be prescribed, and/or address underlying causes such as allergies.

Infants are recommended to be fed every three hours and the milk-drinking pattern is altered upon babies' exposure to alcohol. Each feeding may last as long as 30–60 minutes, as milk supply develops and the infant learns the Suck-Swallow-Breathe pattern. However, as milk supply increases and the infant becomes more efficient at feeding, the duration of feeds may shorten. Older infants may feed less often. When direct breastfeeding is not possible, expressing or pumping to empty the breasts can help mothers avoid plugged milk ducts and breast infection, maintain their milk supply, resolve engorgement, and provide milk to be fed to their infant at a later time. More care are required for the preterm infants, who have immature coordination between sucking and swallowing. Thus, tube feeding is used to feed preterm infants breastmilk while preventing choking. The transition from tube-feeding to oral feeding can be facilitated by oral sensorimotor interventions, which are oral and tongue exercises.

Mothers are recommended to express milk at least three times a day. If milk production is inadequate, formula milk and baby food should be added to the diet. On the contrary, excess milk is strongly advised to be expressed out by either hand expression or pumped out and stored in a container with a lid in the refrigerator. Stored milk can be dated to avoid giving low-quality milk to infants. Refrigerated milk has to be thawed at room temperature and mixed thoroughly to ensure an even distribution of fat before intake.

=== Weaning ===
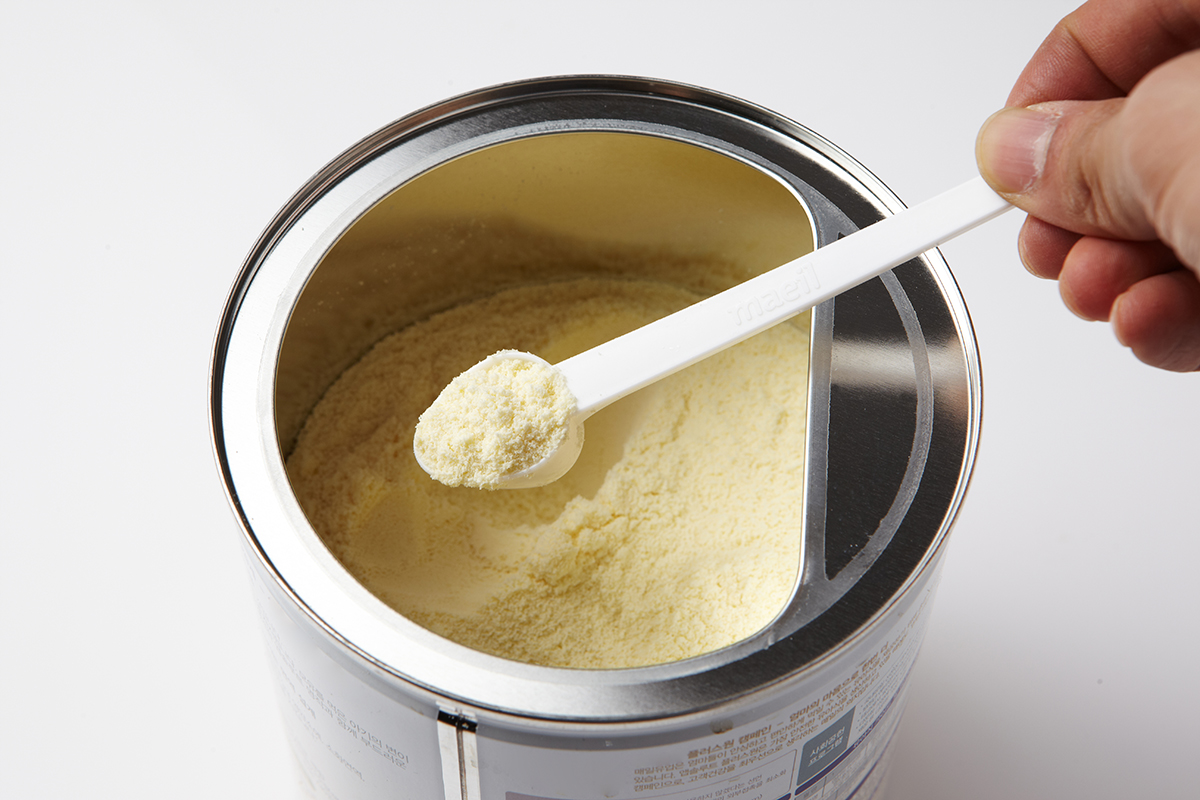
Infant formula

Weaning is the transition of baby's diet from breast milk to semi-solid food, which usually starts from the sixth month onward. Suggested by WHO, six-month-old babies who are introduced to their first solid foods shall also be complementarily fed with breast milk or infant formula as the main drink until two years old or above. The reason for this practice is that breastfeeding not only helps the digestive system with the breaking down of solid foods but it also supplies balanced nutrition for the babies.

Apart from offering solid foods, the frequency of breastfeeding should be reduced gradually to avoid possible adverse events, such as overfull. It is easier to begin with cutting down the least favoured regular daily breastfeed. The pace of weaning is up to the mother and baby, but it is recommended to adopt a progressive reduction approach. When the mother wants to push forward the transition to weaning, she can further suspend another least favoured breastfeed after a couple of days. For babies below one year, it is better to substitute the dropped breastfeed with a bottle of infant formula to guarantee adequate nutrition. As for the babies above one year old, they do not require this kind of replacement as they have already gained nutrients from a wide range of foods and drinks such as whole milk.

=== Relationship establishment with baby through breastfeeding ===
Breastfeeding is an intimate physical contact between mother and baby, which allows the establishment of mutual trust, caring, and connectedness as the foundation of a close parent-child relationship. Breastfeeding enhances the mother-child bonding through manipulating the feelings of the baby and mother.

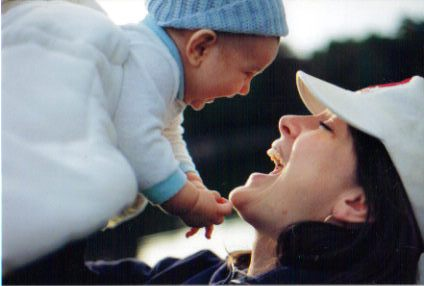
A mother holds up her child, showing a maternal bond.

Regarding the babies, breastfeeding is a special physical interaction that provides comforting, analgesic, and relaxing effects. During weaning, breastfeeding is an approach to comfort the babies when they cry at night. Even the toddler's negative feelings and discomfort can be eased by feeding with breastmilk. These show the consolation given by breastfeeding in strengthening the bonding between mothers and babies.

As for the mothers, oxytocin released during lactation does not only promote milk supply but it also triggers the expression of motherhood. Although the mechanism of oxytocin-inducing maternal love has yet to be elucidated, various studies indicate that oxytocin encourages the mammalian motherly behaviours and provides anti-stress effects. It is generally believed that oxytocin-influencing motherhood can reinforce the attachment between mothers and babies.

== Food, activities, and disease affecting quality of establishment breastfeeding ==
Health of postpartum mothers and infants determines the quality of breastfeeding establishment. Establishment is aided by factors promoting sufficient milk supply but it is susceptible to mastitis.

=== Beneficial foods for mothers and infants ===
Vitamins and minerals taken by mothers are delivered to infants via breastfeeding. Various vitamins are recommended for breastfeeding mothers, including vitamin A, vitamin D, vitamin C, and vitamin B. Maternal vitamin A is supplied to infants to strengthen body development, especially lungs. Vitamin D maintains the balance between calcium and phosphate level to promote formation of infants' skeleton and skeletal muscle . Vitamin C promotes absorption of iron for blood synthesis. Vitamin B may improve cognitive function.

Minerals are also essential for infant growth, including calcium which is responsible for rapid skeletal development. For mothers, increase in calcium intake replenishes the calcium given to baby and prevent excessive reduction in body mineral density. If maternal calcium is inadequate, breastfeeding mothers will have higher risks to develop osteoporosis in their postmenopausal period. Moreover, iron should be taken to maintain the hematological and neurological development of infant and mothers' health.

Furthermore, high consumption of fruits and vegetables enrich the diversity and abundance of nutrients in breastmilk. It might alleviate the psychological distress of postpartum mothers and the risk of postpartum depression.

=== Harmful food and activities for infants ===
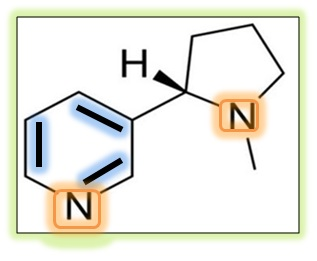
Chemical structure of nicotine

- Breastfeeding mothers should consult doctors before drug consumption. Otherwise, the drugs in breastmilk will affect the children's metabolism.
- Low dose intake of accumulative caffeine by mothers would not affect infants. However, with a continuous maternal accumulation of caffeine by having more than 6 cups (~1,440 mL) of caffeine-containing drinks, the breastfed babies become hyperactive and have their sleeping patterns significantly affected.
- Alcohol diffused in breastmilk blocks the release of oxytocin and milk. Moderate level of alcohol introduces a detrimental effect on motor development of breastfeeding infants.
- Mothers should cease smoking so that nicotine, which brings harmful effects to health, would not be transferred to babies.

=== Methods to promote milk supply ===
In western, galactagogue is a food that aims at increasing milk production. Natural galactagogue mix, including herbal tea, might enhance milk secretion. Pharmacological galactagogues, i.e. medications, also show their abilities in boosting milk production, e.g. domperidone.

In Traditional Chinese Medicine (TCM), Chinese herbal medicine and tuina massage can improve milk production. Papaya fish soup increases production and nutrient of milk. Fish enriches the protein composition of milk while fish oil raises the proportion beneficial fatty acid in milk.

Massage can treat problems of breastfeeding and milk supply. In TCM, acupuncture points including Danzhong (CV17), Shaoshang (LU11) and Hegu (LI4) can be rubbed or acupunctured to promote milk secretion.

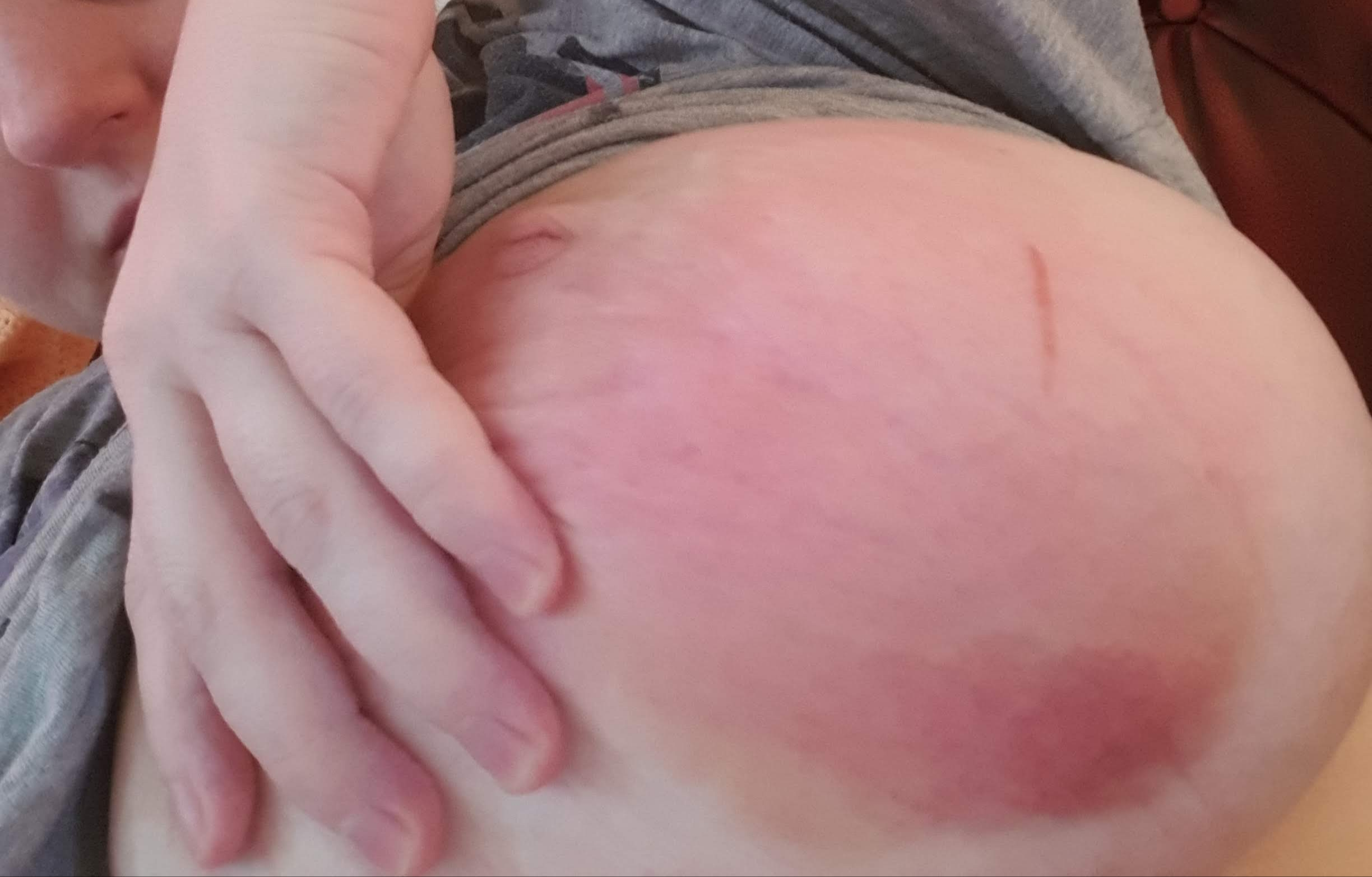
Mastitis induces inflammation and swelling of breast.

=== Mastitis ===
Mastitis is caused by infection of Staphylococcus aureus. Its risk factors include damaged nipple and blockage of the mammary gland caused by oversupply of milk. Due to inflammation, these mothers will have an ill feeling. Their breasts will have lumps and become swollen, red, and painful after infection.

Apart from antibiotics prescription, such as penicillinase-resistant penicillin, mastitis can be treated with effective milk removal by increasing feeding frequency, usage of pump, and massage on the blocked area on breast. Warming breasts and massaging acupuncture points, such as Tianxi (SP18) and Shidou (SP17), facilitate the clearance of blockage and pain relief.
