= Cystic neutrophilic granulomatous mastitis =

Cystic neutrophilic granulomatous mastitis (CNGM) is a rare form of granulomatous mastitis, an inflammatory disease of the breast. It has a distinctive microscopic appearance involving lipid-containing spaces surrounded by neutrophils and histiocytes, and is often associated with bacteria of the genus Corynebacterium.

== Clinical features ==
CNGM typically affects women of reproductive age, often with a history of pregnancy. It commonly presents as a palpable breast mass that may be painful. Its clinical and pathological features can overlap with other forms of granulomatous mastitis and can resemble breast cancer.

== Pathology and diagnosis ==
Diagnosis is based on microscopic examination of breast tissue. The characteristic findings are suppurative lipogranulomas: lipid spaces rimmed by neutrophils, with an outer layer of epithelioid histiocytes. The surrounding inflammation may include multinucleated giant cells and lymphocytes.

Gram-positive bacilli may be found within the lipid spaces using a Gram stain. Organisms can be sparse, and negative staining or culture results do not exclude CNGM. Examination of additional Gram-stained sections can improve detection.

Suppurative and granulomatous inflammation with cystic lipid spaces. H&E stain, low power.

A lipid space with surrounding inflammatory cells. H&E stain, high power.

Gram-positive bacilli within a cystic lipid space. Gram stain.

== Treatment ==
Treatment may include prolonged antibiotic therapy directed against corynebacteria. When an organism is recovered, identification to species level and antimicrobial susceptibility testing can guide antibiotic selection, as susceptibility varies among Corynebacterium species.
