= William Fetherstone Montgomery =

Irish obstetrician (1797–1859)

- Born: 1797; Dublin, Ireland
- Died: 1859 (aged 61–62); Dublin, Ireland
- Resting place: Mount Jerome Cemetery, Dublin
- Education: medicine
- Alma mater: Trinity College Dublin
- Occupations: Academia (Professor of Midwifery), Obstetrics, Gynecology
- Years active: 1820s–1859
- Employer: College of Physicians
- Known for: Obstetrics, Gynecology

William Fetherstone Montgomery (1797–1859) was an Irish obstetrician credited for first describing the Glands of Montgomery.

== Life ==
Montgomery was born, raised and educated in Dublin, Ireland. He attended medical school at Trinity College Dublin. After graduating Montgomery was appointed professor of Midwifery at the College of Physicians in Dublin and would later serve two terms as President of the college.

His papers and studies were focused on the breast, in particular changes to the nipple and areola. He was instrumental in establishing the chair of obstetrics at the Irish College of Physicians. He died in 1859 of angina pectoris and buried at Mount Jerome Cemetery in Dublin.

Montgomery was married; his great-grandson H. L. Hardy Greer was an obstetrician at the Royal Maternity Hospital in Belfast.
