= Cracked nipple =

Painful, postpartum condition in breastfeeding women

Cracked nipple (nipple trauma or nipple fissure) is a condition that can occur in breastfeeding women as a result of a number of possible causes. Developing a cracked nipple can result in soreness, dryness or irritation to, or bleeding of, one or both nipples during breastfeeding. The mother with a cracked nipple can have severe nipple pain when the baby is nursing. This severe pain is a disincentive for continued breastfeeding. The crack can appear as a cut across the tip of the nipple and may extend to its base. Cracked nipple can develop after the birth of the infant and is managed with pharmacological and nonpharmacological treatment.

== Signs and symptoms ==
Cracked nipples are classified as a breast disorder. The nipple is not only the structure to deliver milk to the infant, it also contains small, sebaceous glands or Montgomery glands to lubricate the skin of the areola. Cracked nipples are most often associated with breastfeeding and appear as cracks or small lacerations or breaks in the skin of the nipple. In some instances an ulcer will form. The nipple in a nursing mother is in regular contact with a nursing infant. Cracked nipples are trauma to the nipple and can be quite painful. Cracked nipples typically appear three to seven days after the birth.

If the nipples appears to be wedge-shaped, white and flattened, this may indicate that the latch is not good and there is a potential of developing cracked nipples.

=== Complications ===
Bacteria can enter the breast through cracked nipples, which increase the risk of mastitis. Candida infection (thrush) of the nipple can also occur, resulting in deep-pink, cracked, and sore nipples.

=== Contraindications for breastfeeding ===
Because cracked nipples can result in the infant being exposed to blood, women with certain blood-borne diseases may be advised to stop breastfeeding if they have a cracked nipple. It has been found safe for breastfeeding mothers with hepatitis B and cracked nipples to breastfeed. In the event that a nursing woman experiences cracked and bleeding nipples or breast inflammation within one to two weeks immediately following an acute Toxoplasmosis infection (when the organism is still circulating in her bloodstream), it is theoretically possible that she could transmit Toxoplasma gondii to the infant through her breast milk. Immune suppressed women could have circulating Toxoplasma for even longer periods of time. However, the likelihood of human milk transmission is very small. Transmission risk of HIV increases if the mother has cracked and bleeding nipples. An uncommon infection in the mother, Chagas disease, can be transmitted to the nursing infant via cracked nipples. Women with hepatitis C are advised to abstain from breastfeeding if their nipples are cracked or bleeding.

== Cause ==
Some studies indicate that cracked nipples are caused by poor latch. Yet other causes could be poor positioning, use of a feeding bottle, breast engorgement, inexperience, semi-protruding nipples, use of breast pumps and light pigmentation of the nipples. Breast engorgement is also a main factor in altering the ability of the infant to latch-on. Engorgement changes the shape and curvature of the nipple region by making the breast inflexible, flat, hard, and swollen. The nipples on an engorged breast are flat.

When the baby is latched on correctly, the nipple is located against the soft palate in the back of the baby's mouth. When the nipple is near the front of the mouth and being pinched against the hard palate, this will cause pain and development of cracked nipples. One cause of painful, cracked nipples is the incorrect positioning and incorrect latching on to the breast by the infant. The baby can create cracked nipples due to the strong sucking pressure, stretching and pulling the nipple, the friction and rubbing of skin to skin. The cause of sore, cracked nipples can also be from a yeast or Candida infection in the baby or the mother or both. Thrush can develop after the use of antibiotics. For first-time breastfeeding mothers, it normally takes a few tries before the latch is right, which can make the nipples tender and sore the first few days. If the nipples become cracked or bleed, the latch may need to be corrected. Women are advised to keep on breastfeeding, as it will actually help the nipples heal. A little breast milk or purified lanolin cream or ointment helps the healing process.

If a feeding bottle is used in addition to breastfeeding, cracked nipples may result because the different sucking techniques required for the bottle and the breast vary. Bottle-feeding babies uses his or her tongue to regulate the flow of milk. This same technique will cause friction on the nipple while breastfeeding. This, in turn, encourages the continued use of the bottle with less time breastfeeding.

Pain caused by cracked nipples can sometimes lead to the cessation of breast-feeding. In addition to cracks, blisters or ulcers can form.

== Prevention ==
The nipples of nursing mothers naturally make a lubricant to prevent drying, cracking, or infections. Cracked nipples may be able to be prevented by:

- Avoid soaps and harsh washing or drying of the breasts and nipples. This can cause dryness and cracking.
- Rubbing a little breast milk on the nipple after feeding to protect it.
- Keeping the nipples dry to prevent cracking and infection.

In addition, correct breastfeeding techniques—such as achieving an asymmetrical, deep latch, frequently adjusting positions, and nursing on demand—and ensure the proper use of breast pumps, including selecting the appropriate flange size and suction level while avoiding excessive suction.

Roman chamomile is sometimes used as a remedy in alternative medicine to treat cracked nipples by a topical application. However, there is no scientific evidence for its efficacy, and is in fact considered unsafe for use during pregnancy.

== Treatment ==
Cracked nipples can be treated with 100% lanolin. Glycerin nipple pads can be chilled and placed over the nipples to help soothe and heal cracked or painful nipples. If the cause of cracked nipples is from thrush, treatment is usually begun with nystatin. If the mother is symptomatic then the mother and the baby can be treated. Continuing to breastfeed will actually help the nipples heal. A little breast milk or purified lanolin cream or ointment helps the healing process. Breastfeeding professionals that include nurses, midwives and lactation consultants are able to assist in the treatment of cracked nipples.

Advice from others is abundant; however, some treatments have been identified as ineffective for healing or preventing cracked nipples. These ineffective treatments include keeping breastfeeding sessions short and using a nipple guard. Shortening feedings to allow the nipples to rest does not alleviate the pain of cracked nipples and may adversely affect milk supply. Additionally, nipple shields do not improve latching.

== Epidemiology ==
In a survey in New York City, 35% of nursing mothers stopped breastfeeding after one week due to the pain of cracked nipples. Thirty percent stopped breastfeeding between weeks one and three. Another survey of breastfeeding mothers in Brazil reported that there was 25% higher risk of interruption of exclusive breastfeeding when the women had cracked nipples. Mothers with higher education levels were more likely to continue breastfeeding despite the pain of cracked nipples.

== Society and culture ==
The importance of preventing cracked nipples while breastfeeding has been reported. In an informal survey of breastfeeding in the UK, some mothers reported that they stopped breastfeeding because the cracked nipples made it too painful.

== See also ==
- List of cutaneous conditions

== Bibliography ==
- Henry, Norma (2016). RN maternal newborn nursing: review module. Stilwell, KS: Assessment Technologies Institute. ISBN 978-1-56533-569-1.
- Dennis, Cindy-Lee; Jackson, Kim; Watson, Jo (2014-12-15). "The Cochrane Library". Cochrane Database of Systematic Reviews (12) CD007366. doi:10.1002/14651858.cd007366.pub2. PMC 10885851. PMID 25506813.
