= Areola =

Pigmented area on the breast around the nipple

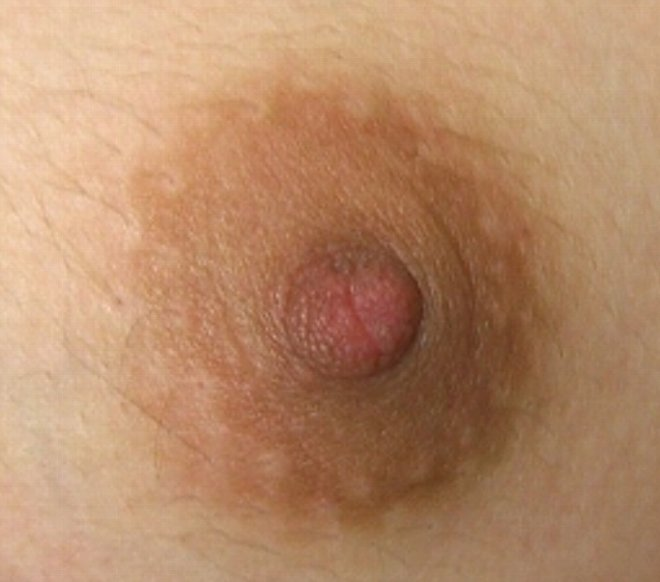

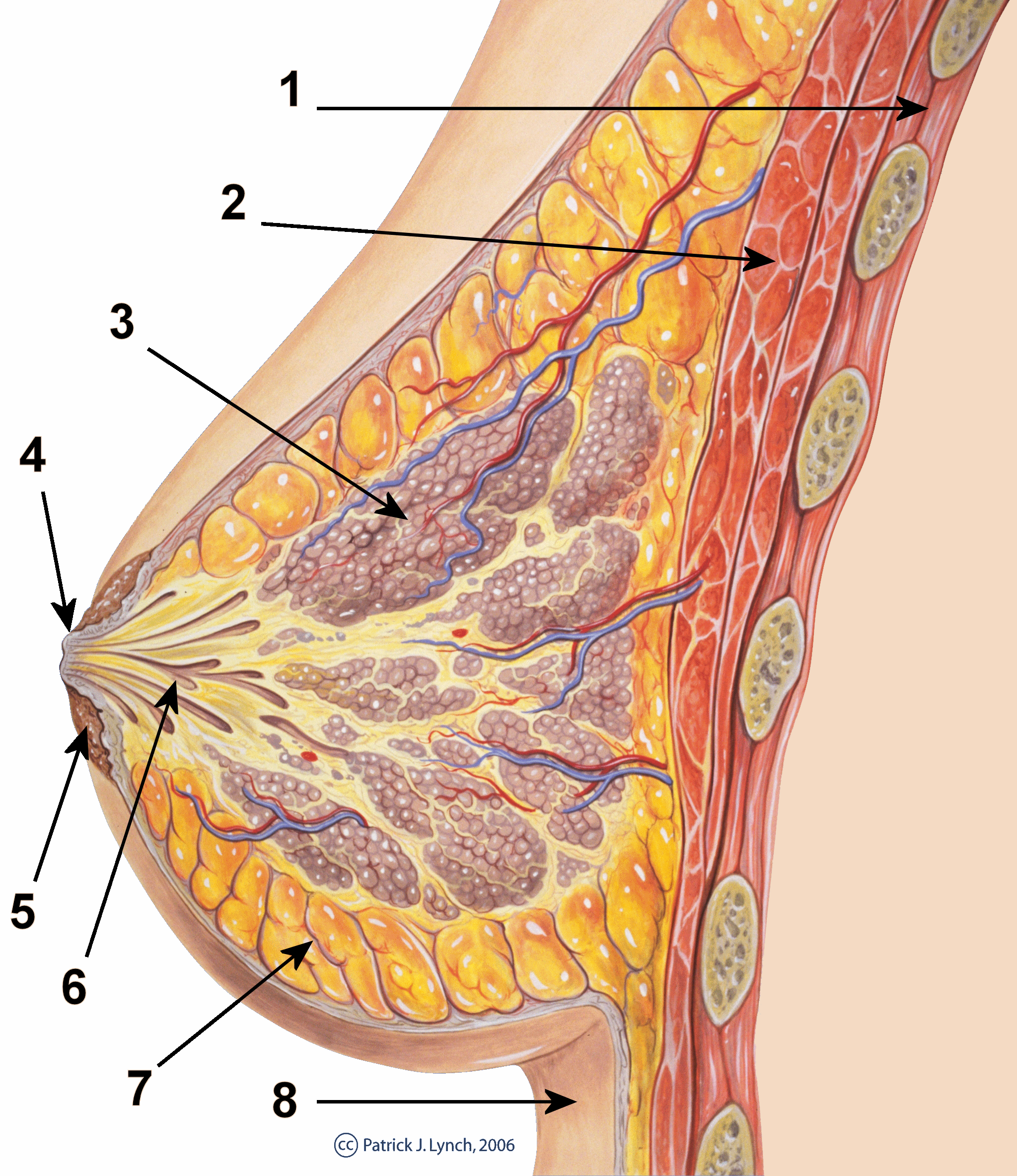
- Breast schematic diagram (adult female human cross section); Legend: 1. Thoracic wall 2. Pectoralis muscles 3. Lobules 4. Nipple 5. Areola 6. Duct; 7. Fatty tissue 8. Skin

Details

Identifiers
- Latin: areola mammae
- TA98: A16.0.02.012
- TA2: 7106
- FMA: 67796

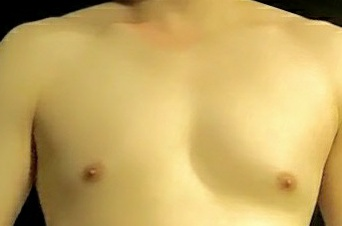
A male breast

The human areola (areola mammae, /əˈriːələ/ or /ˌæriˈoʊlə/) is the specialized area of skin on the breast around the nipple that is contrastedly pigmented. More generally, an areola is a small circular area on the body with a different histology from the surrounding tissue, or other small circular areas such as an inflamed region of skin.

The mature human female nipple has several small openings arranged radially around the tip of the lactiferous ducts, from which milk is released during lactation. The other small openings in the areola are sebaceous glands, also known as areolar glands. The nipple and areola are often considered together; many cultures necessitate their covering for public decency.

== Shade ==
The areolae can range from pink to red to brown to dark brown or nearly black, but generally tend to be paler among people with lighter skin tones and darker among people with darker skin tones. A reason for the differing color may be to make the nipple area more visible to the infant.

Hyperpigmentation occurs in most women during the second stage of pregnancy, leading to a temporarily darker shade.

== Size and shape ==
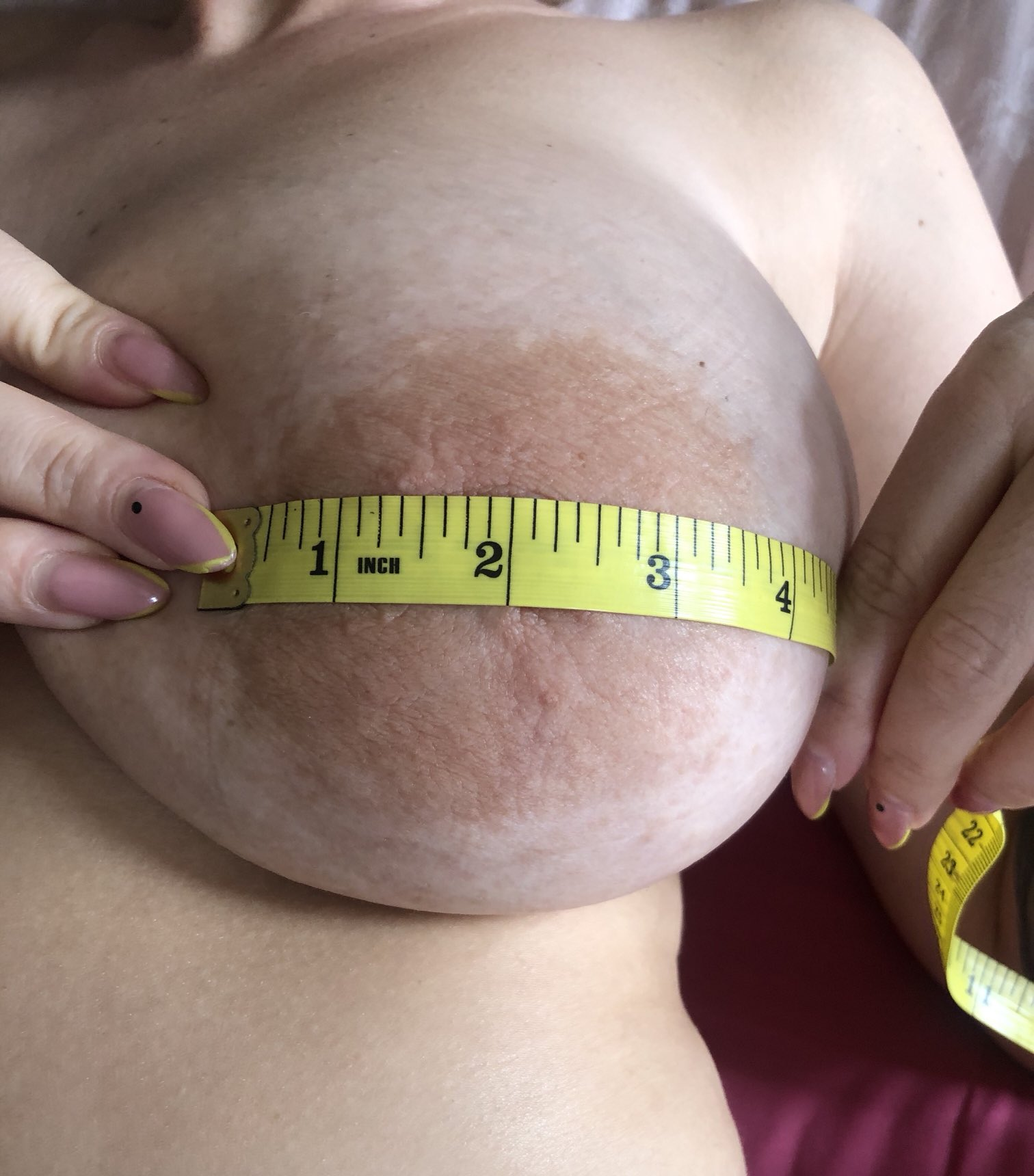
A woman’s areola being measured.

The size and shape of areolae and nipples are also highly variable, with those of women usually being larger than those of men and prepubescent girls. Human areolae are mostly circular in shape, but many women have large areolae that are noticeably elliptical.

The average diameter of male areolae is around 28.0 mm (1.1 in). Sexually mature women have an average of 38.1 mm (1.5 in), but sizes can exceed 100 mm (4 in). Lactating women, and women with particularly large breasts, may have even larger areolae. A function of the specialized dermis of the areola is to protect the regular breast skin from wear, cracking, and irritation. Infants sometimes create trauma to the nipple and areolae by latching-on.

Rated according to the Tanner scale of female physical development, the areolae enlarge during stage 3, but they show no separation of contour. During stage 4, the areolae and papillae rise above breast level and form secondary mounds. By stage 5, the breasts have fully developed. As this has resulted in recession of the areolae, the papillae may reach a little above the breasts' contour.

Pregnancy can cause enlargement of the areola tissue and of Montgomery glands or tubercles.

== Mechanoreceptors ==
Breastfeeding by the baby stimulates slowly and rapidly adapting mechanoreceptors that are densely packed around the areolar region.

== Diseases ==
Paget's disease of the breast is a malignant condition that outwardly may have the appearance of eczema, with skin changes involving the areola and nipple.

== See also ==
- List of specialized glands within the human integumentary system
