= Silicone granuloma =

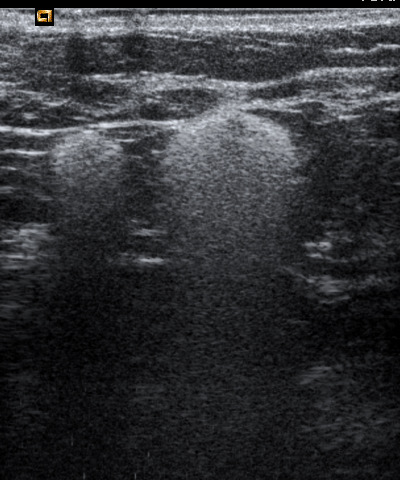
- Snowball like hyperechogenic axillary lymph nodes in a woman with silicone implants removed due to complications
- Specialty: Dermatology

Silicone granulomas are a skin condition that occur as a reaction to liquid silicones, and are characterized by the formation of nodules.

Formation of a granuloma is a common tissue response to a range of foreign bodies. Silicone can be directly injected into tissue as part of a cosmetic procedure or it can leak from silicone implants. The formation and consequences of silicon-induced granulomas is not well described or understood. The extent of damage that they cause is controversial.

== Localization ==
- Lymph node: Granulomatous lymphadenitis
- Skin: Granulomatous dermatitis
- Penis
- Breast: Granulomatous mastitis
- Face: Granulomatous facial reaction

== Effects ==
Silicone-induced granuloma can be associated with fever, calcitriol-mediated hypercalcemia, reactive amyloidosis.

== Treatment ==
Treatment of silicone granulomas and removal of unwanted silicone have historically been very challenging. Anti-inflammatory agents (e.g., oral corticosteroids, allopurinol, colchicine, isotretinoin, cyclosporine, imiquimod, antibiotics) may help treat the granulomatous inflammation, but do not address or remove the underlying source silicone material. Surgical excision allows for removal of the underlying source of inflammation, but is often deferred due to associated scarring.

More recently, a case of successful removal of injected silicone using microcoring technology was reported, providing a potential scar-less option for its removal.

== Gallery ==
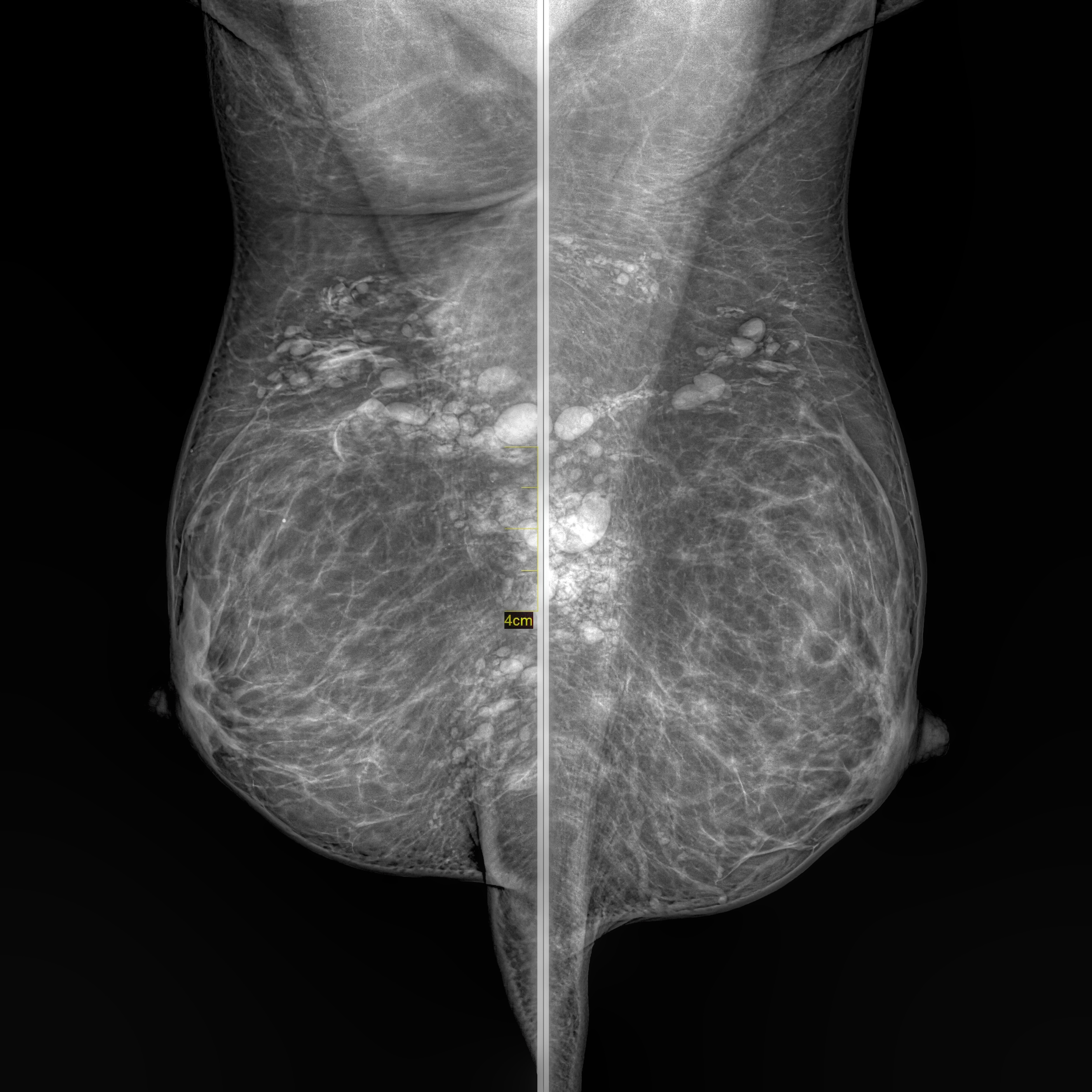

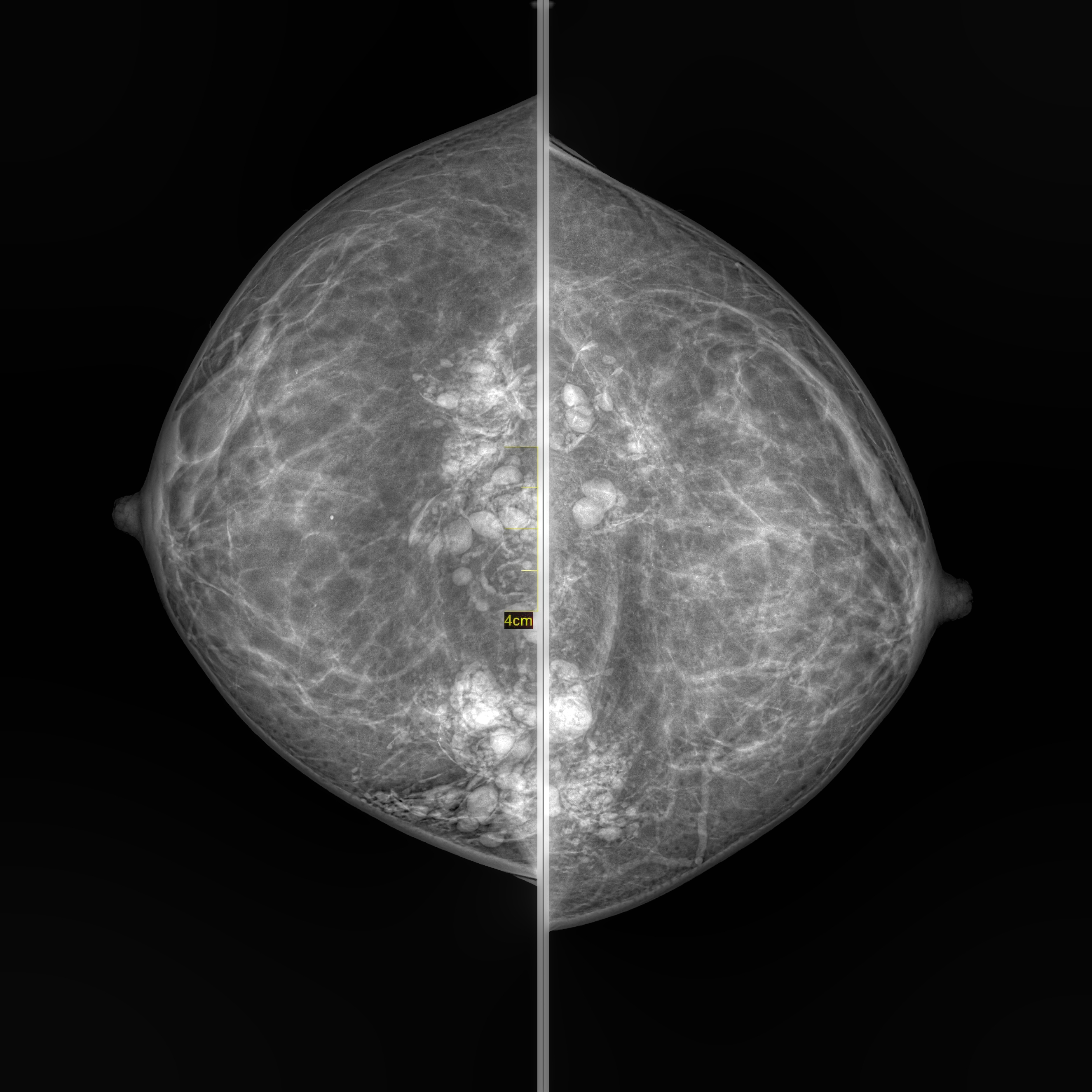

== See also ==
- Granuloma
- Skin lesion
