= Latch (breastfeeding) =

Way a baby fastens onto the breast while breastfeeding

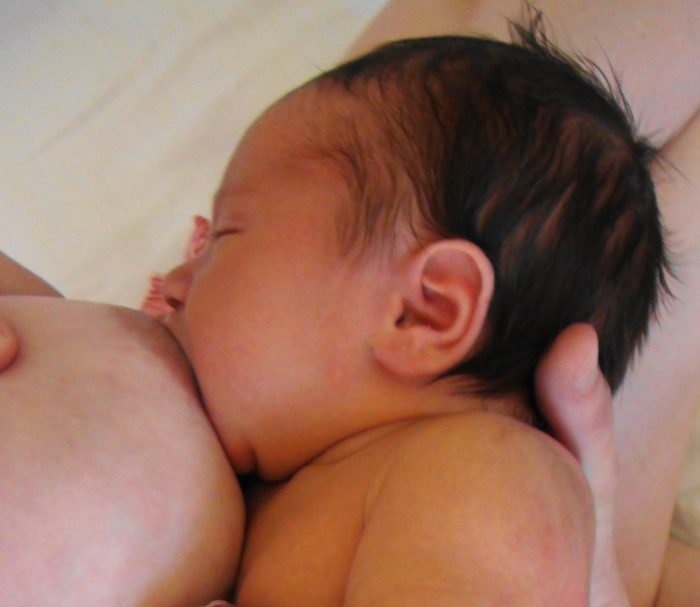
A good latch. The lower portion of the areola is well within the baby's mouth, which is opened wide. Lips are flanged out.

The process of achieving a good latch (1 minute 7 seconds)

Latch is how the baby fastens onto the breast while breastfeeding. A good latch promotes high milk flow and minimizes nipple discomfort for the mother, whereas poor latch results in poor milk transfer to the baby and can quickly lead to sore and cracked nipples. In a good latch, both the nipple and a large portion of the areola are in the baby's mouth.

== Positioning ==
How breastfeeding latch affects milk flow (12 seconds)

Assuming a comfortable position helps the baby to latch properly. It takes practice to get a good latch. The nursing hold that works best for mother and baby is sometimes discovered through trial and error.

Getting a good latch for breasting can be learned. Recommendations for nursing mothers is to:

- Wait for the baby to open their mouth widely. Tickling the baby's upper lip with the mother's nipple can help prompt the mouth to open more.
- Look for the baby's belly button. If the belly button is visible while the baby is latched, the baby's not comfortable enough to latch well.
- Look around. If the nursing mother can chat and use her hands without concentrating on holding her position, that's a good position for a latch.
- Check the nipples. The sensitivity of the skin on the nipples and breasts helps the mother's breasts respond to the baby and helps the mother know how much milk to make. When the baby is latched correctly, the bottom part of the areola is also in their mouth. But a shallow latch, even if it doesn't hurt right away, will start to hurt soon. A poorly latched baby has to work harder to get the milk out.

Latching on is facilitated by secretions from the nipple that are reported to help align the infants' head with the mother's breast and thought to promote latching and sucking.

== Pain ==
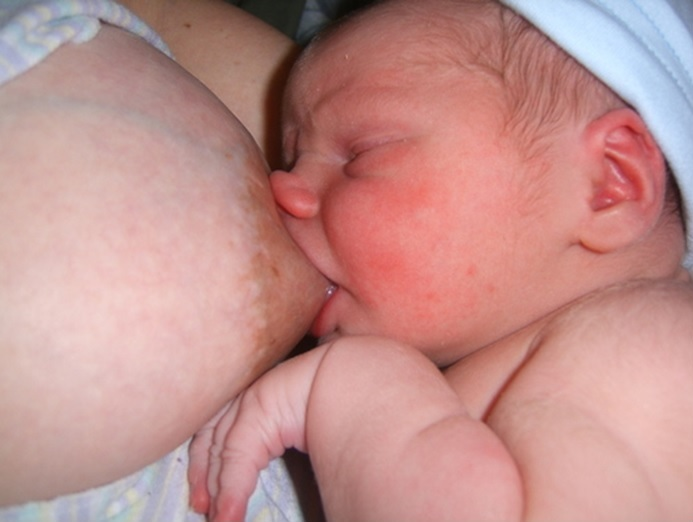
A shallow latch, where the tongue does not have good contact with the areola, leads to pain and poor milk flow.

Pain or pinching is a good indication of a poor latch. If the pain lasts longer than a few seconds, the latch is probably too shallow. The technique for getting a good latch is to gently break the suction by placing a clean finger into the baby's mouth and help the baby latch on again. It is normal for the nipple to look slightly elongated or drawn-out.

When the baby latches, it can feel like a pinch that goes away. If it's more painful than that, it's probably a bad latch. A bad, uncorrected latch can damage the nipple and compromise milk flow for the baby.

Infants will naturally move their head while looking and feeling for a breast to feed. There are many ways to start feeding the infant, and the best approach is the one that works for the mother and the infant. The steps below can help with getting the infant to "latch" on to the breast for feeding.

Hold the infant against a bare chest. Dress the infant in only a diaper to ensure skin-to-skin contact. Keep the infant upright, with their head directly under the chin. Support the infant's neck and shoulders with one hand and their hips with the other hand. The infant may try to move around to find the breast. The infant's head should be slightly tilted back to make nursing and swallowing easier. When their head is tilted back and the mouth is open, the tongue will naturally be down in the mouth to allow the breast to go on top of it. At first, allow the breast to hang naturally. The infant may open their mouth when the nipple is near their mouth. The mother also can gently guide the infant to latch on to the nipple. While the infant is feeding, their nostrils may flare to breathe in air. Do not panic—this flaring is normal. The infant can breathe normally while breastfeeding. As the infant tilts backward, support their upper back and shoulders with the palm of the hand and gently pull the infant close.

It is recommended by WHO that breastfeeding should be started immediately after a new born's birth; within the first hour and should continue until the infant stops wanting to nurse. Health organizations including the WHO recommend exclusively breastfeeding for six months; this means that no other foods or drinks—other than vitamin D supplement—are typically given.

== Tongue-tie ==
Sometimes, a baby's tongue is stuck to the bottom of the mouth by a band of tissue, which means the baby cannot open his or her mouth wide enough to get a good latch. Checking for tongue-tie is not a standard newborn test. If the baby is not latching on well and doesn't seem to be gaining weight mothers are advised to contact the pediatrician or nurse to ask about this. Fortunately, it is a very simple fix. Once tongue-tie is treated by a medical professional, breastfeeding typically improves.

== Good latch ==
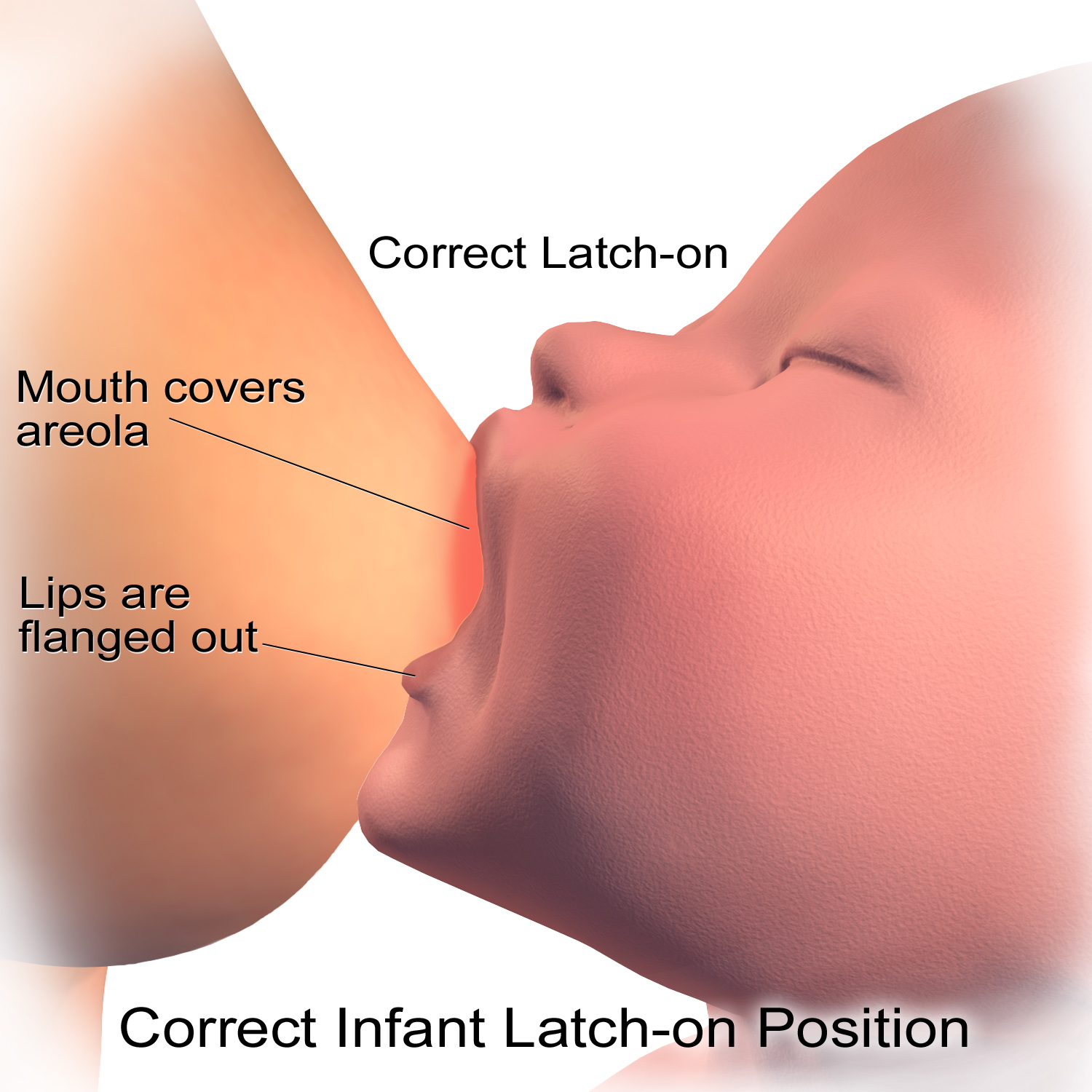
Latching illustration

A good latch is important for both effective breastfeeding and comfort. Review the following signs to determine whether the infant has a good latch:

- The latch feels comfortable and does not hurt or pinch. How it feels is a more important sign of a good latch than how it looks.
- The infant does not need to turn their head while feeding. Their chest is close to the body.
- Little or no areola, which is the dark-colored skin on the breast that surrounds the nipple. Depending on the size of the areola and the size of the infant's mouth, it is possible to only see a small amount of areola. If more areola is showing, it should seem that more is above the infant's lip and less is below.
- The infant's mouth will be filled with breast when in the best latch position.
- The infant's tongue is cupped under the breast, although it might not be seen.
- The infant's swallowing can be heard or seen. Because some babies swallow so quietly, the only way of knowing that they are swallowing is when a pause in their breathing is heard.
- The infant's ears "wiggle" slightly.
- The infant's lips turn outward, similar to fish lips, not inward. The infant's bottom lip may not be seen.
- The infant's chin touches the breast.

== Poor latching ==
A shallow latch causes the sensitive nipple skin to press against the bones in the top of the baby's mouth. That can cause pain and lead to cracked nipples.

A poor latch results in a poor flow of milk to the baby, even if the mother is capable of producing plenty of milk. If not corrected quickly, inadequate milk transfer can lead to dehydration and failure to thrive in the baby, and blocked milk ducts and mastitis in the mother. Lactation consultants are experts in helping mothers teach their babies to latch better.

== Bibliography ==
- Henry, Norma (2016). RN maternal newborn nursing: review module. Stilwell, KS: Assessment Technologies Institute. ISBN 978-1-56533-569-1.
