= Inflammatory breast cancer =

- Specialty: Oncology

Inflammatory breast cancer (IBC) is one of the most aggressive types of breast cancer. It can occur in women of any age (and, extremely rarely, in men, see male breast cancer). It is referred to as "inflammatory" due to its frequent presentation with symptoms resembling a skin inflammation, such as erysipelas.

Inflammatory breast cancer presents with variable signs and symptoms, frequently without detectable lumps or tumors; it therefore is often not detected by mammography or ultrasound. Typical presentation is rapid breast swelling, sometimes associated with skin changes (peau d'orange), and nipple retraction. Other signs include redness, persistent itching, and unusually warm skin. IBC often initially resembles mastitis. Approximately 50% to 75% of cases have the typical presentation; an atypical presentation makes diagnosis more difficult. In some cases, a sign such as acute central venous thrombosis may be the sole presenting indication of the disease.

IBC comprises a small proportion of breast cancer cases (1% to 6% in the USA). African-Americans are usually diagnosed with IBC at younger ages than Caucasian women, and they are also at higher risk for the disease. Recent advances in therapy have improved the prognosis considerably; at least one-third of women will survive with IBC for ten years or longer.

== Symptoms ==
Signs and symptoms are quite variable, and may not be present at all in "occult" inflammatory breast cancer. Rapid onset of symptoms is typical; the breast often looks swollen and red, or "inflamed", sometimes seemingly changing overnight. IBC is frequently misdiagnosed as mastitis. Invasion of the local lymphatic ducts, the hallmark sign of IBC, impairs lymphatic drainage and causes edematous swelling of the breast. Because the skin of the breast is tethered by the suspensory ligament of Cooper, the accumulation of fluid within the lymphatic system of the skin may cause the breast skin to assume a dimpled appearance similar to an orange peel (peau d'orange). A palpable tumor is not always found as it would be in other forms of breast cancer.

Symptoms may include:

- Sudden swelling of the breast
- Skin changes on breast
- Reddened area with a texture resembling the peel of an orange (peau d'orange)
- Nipple retraction (flattened look) or discharge
- Pain in the breast
- Itching of breast
- Swelling of lymph nodes under the arm or in the neck
- Unusual warmth of the affected breast
- Breast is harder or firmer

Other symptoms may rarely include:

- Swelling of the arm
- Breast size may seem to decrease instead of increasing
- Although a dominant mass is present in many cases, most inflammatory cancers present as diffuse infiltration of the breast without a well-defined tumor.
- A lump may be present and grow rapidly

Most patients do not experience every known symptom of IBC. Not all symptoms need to be present to make an IBC diagnosis.

== Diagnosis ==
The reliable method of diagnosis by imaging, Mammography, breast MRI or ultrasound, which often show suspicious signs (general skin edema, skin thickening, mass, suspected breast lesions). It is important to biopsy the suspected lesions and/or skin. However, despite significant effort, a diagnosis could be missed. Therefore, repeat imaging and biopsies are important if a diagnosis of IBC is suspected.

Clinical presentation is typical in only 50% to 75% of cases; many other conditions, such as mastitis or even cardiac insufficiency, can mimic the typical symptoms of inflammatory breast cancer.

Temporary regression or fluctuation of symptoms, spontaneously or in response to medications or hormonal events should not be considered of any significance in diagnosis. Treatment with antibiotics or progesterone have been observed to cause a temporary regression of symptoms in certain cases.

== Characterization ==
Inflammatory breast cancer is a high-grade aneuploid cancer, with mutations and overexpression of p53, high levels of E-cadherin and abnormal cadherin function. It is often regarded as a systemic cancer. A large number of IBC cases present as triple negative breast cancer (TNBC). Similar to TNBC, as opposed to hormone receptor-positive breast cancer, there is a high rate of relapse and metastasis in the first three years after presentation, with few late events (five years or later).

IBC is characterised by the presence of cancer cells in the subdermal lymphatics on skin biopsy. Consequently, IBC is always staged at stage IIIB or above, as that type of locally advanced disease is a classic prognostic indicator.

Searches for biomolecular characteristics has produced a broad range of possible biomarkers, such as loss of LIBC and WISP3 expression. Inflammatory breast cancer is similar in many ways, both prognostically and treatment-wise, to late-stage or metastatic breast cancer; it can be distinguished from those cancer types both by molecular footprint and clinical presentation. On the molecular level, some similarity exists with pancreatic cancer.

Estrogen and progesterone receptor status is frequently negative, corresponding with poor survival. IBC tumors are highly angiogenic and vascular, with high levels of VEGF and bFGF expression.

A number of proteins and signalling pathways show behaviour of biochemicals which can be considered paradoxical, compared with their function in normal tissue as well as in other breast cancer types.

- Caveolin 1 and caveolin 2 are overexpressed, and may contribute to tumour cell motility
- E-cadherin is overexpressed; paradoxically, it is associated with especially aggressive subtypes of IBC.

RhoC GTPase is overexpressed, possibly related to overexpression (hypomethylation) of caveolin 1 and caveolin 2. Caveolin is, paradoxically, tumour-promoting in IBC. NF-κB pathway activation overexpression may contribute to the inflammatory phenotype.

The epidermal growth factor receptor (EGFR) pathway is commonly active in inflammatory breast cancer; this has the clinical implication that EGFR targeting therapy may be effective in inflammatory breast cancer.

== Epidemiology ==
IBC occurs in all adult age groups. While the majority of patients are between 40 and 59 years old, age predilection is much less pronounced than in noninflammatory breast cancer. The overall rate is 1.3 cases per 100000; black women (1.6) have the highest rate, Asian and Pacific Islander women the lowest (0.7) rates.

Most known breast cancer risk predictors do not apply for inflammatory breast cancer. It may be slightly negatively associated with cumulative breast-feeding duration.

Whether inflammation contributes to the development of this disease remains an area of ongoing research.

== Role of hormones ==
Age distribution and relation to breastfeeding duration is suggestive of the involvement of hormones in the causation of IBC; however, significant differences exist between IBC and other breast cancers.

Typically, IBC shows low levels of estrogen and progesterone receptor sensitivity, which corresponds with poor outcome. In IBC cases with positive estrogen receptor status, antihormonal treatment is believed to improve outcome.

Paradoxically, some findings suggest that especially-aggressive phenotypes of IBC are characterised by a high level of NF kappaB target gene expression, which can be, under laboratory conditions, successfully modulated by estrogen, but not by tamoxifen.

== Staging ==
Staging is designed to help organize the different treatment plans and to understand the prognosis better. Staging for IBC has been adapted to meet the specific characteristics of the disease. IBC is typically diagnosed in one of these stages:

- Stage IIIB - at least 1/3 of the skin of the breast is affected, and cancer may have spread to tissues near the breast, such as the chest skin or chest wall, including the ribs and muscles in the chest. The cancer may have spread to lymph nodes near the breast or under the arm.
- Stage IIIC - N3 nodal involvement with an inflamed breast will upgrade the disease from Stage IIIB to Stage IIIC.
- Stage IV means that the cancer has spread to other organs. These can include the bones, lungs, liver, and/or brain.

== Treatment ==
The standard treatment for newly diagnosed inflammatory breast cancer is to receive systemic therapy prior to surgery, followed by the radiation therapy. Achieving "no disease [pathological complete response (pCR)]" in the surgical samples gives the best prognosis. Surgery is modified radical mastectomy. Lumpectomy, segmentectomy, or skin sparing mastectomy are not recommended. Immediate reconstructive surgery is not recommended. Immediate,"upfront" surgery is contraindicated, as results are better using neoadjuvant chemotherapy first. Contralateral prophylactic mastectomy is not recommended because it can delay the other systemic adjuvant treatment or adjuvant radiation therapy. After surgery, all cases are recommended for radiation therapy unless it is contraindicated.

Due to the aggressive nature of the disease, it is highly recommended that people with IBC be seen by an IBC specialist and by a multidisciplinary team of health workers. Exploring whether clinical trials are available is very important.

In patients with newly diagnosed IBC with metastatic diseases, it is essential to discuss whether palliative surgery of the breast is indicated after the systemic treatment. In the non-IBC setting, palliative surgery is not recommended; however, for IBC, palliative surgery to improve the QOL and to improve the long-term outcome is explored in certain medical conditions.

It is critical for people with IBC to seek novel targeted therapy in a clinical trial setting. Three-modality combination therapy: surgery, chemotherapy, and radiation, was, in 2014, reported as being under-utilized in the USA. Estrogen and progesterone receptor-positive cases of IBC have not been shown to have a better prognosis than hormone receptor-negative cases. Pathological complete response to preoperative chemotherapy imparts a more favorable prognosis than a pathological complete response to surgery. Loss of diploidy (heterozygosity) and extensive breast inflammation upon first clinical examination are associated with a significantly worse IBC prognosis. A premenopausal occurrence of IBC has a significantly worse prognosis than a postmenopausal diagnosis. In postmenopausal cases, lean women have a significantly better prognosis than obese women. Among breast cancer patients with distant metastasis at diagnosis (stage IV disease), the overall survival (OS) is worse in patients with IBC than in those with non-IBC breast cancers.
