= Granulomatous mastitis =

- Specialty: Gynecology Surgery Breast Surgeon

Granulomatous mastitis can be divided into idiopathic granulomatous mastitis (also known as granular lobular mastitis) and granulomatous mastitis occurring as a rare secondary complication of a great variety of other conditions such as tuberculosis and other infections, sarcoidosis and granulomatosis with polyangiitis. Special forms of granulomatous mastitis occur as complication of diabetes. Some cases are due to silicone injection (Silicone-induced granulomatous inflammation) or other foreign body reactions.

Idiopathic granulomatous mastitis (IGM) is defined as granulomatous mastitis without any other attributable cause such as those above mentioned. It occurs on average two years and, almost exclusively, up to six years after pregnancy, usual age range is 17 to 42 years. Some cases have been reported that were related to drug induced hyperprolactinemia. It has been exceptionally rarely diagnosed during pregnancy and in men.

Primary presentation of any of these conditions as mastitis is very rare and in many cases probably predisposed by other breast or systemic conditions. Although granulomatous mastitis is easily confused with cancer it is a completely benign (non-cancerous) condition. Treatment is radically different for idiopathic granulomatous mastitis and other granulomatous lesions of the breast. The precise diagnosis is therefore very important.

== Symptoms ==
Patients mostly present with a hard lump in one breast without any sign of a systemic disease. Other possible symptoms include nipple retraction, pain, inflammation of the overlying skin, nipple discharge, fistula, enlarged lymph nodes and, in rare cases, peau d'orange-like changes. Presentation is mostly unilateral although a significant share of cases is bilateral. In many cases contralateral or bilateral recurrences were documented. Several cases occurring together with fever, polyarthralgia and erythema nodosum, were documented.

== Diagnosis ==
Characteristic for idiopathic granulomatous mastitis are multinucleated giant cells and epithelioid histiocytes forming non-caseating granulomas around lobules. Often minor ductal and periductal inflammation is present. The lesion is in some cases very difficult to distinguish from breast cancer and other causes such as infections (tuberculosis, syphilis, corynebacterial infection, mycotic infection), autoimmune diseases (sarcoidosis, granulomatosis with polyangiitis), foreign body reaction and granulomatous. Reaction in a carcinoma must be excluded.

The condition is diagnosed very rarely. As the diagnosis is a lengthy differential diagnosis of exclusion, there is considerable uncertainty about incidence. It has been suspected that some cases diagnosed as IGM in developing countries may have other explanations. On the other hand, IGM is usually diagnosed only after complications and referral to a secondary breast care center so light cases may resolve spontaneously or after symptomatic treatment and thus never be diagnosed as IGM. As a completely pathogen free breast will be exceedingly rare even in a completely healthy population, there is also uncertainty when to consider pathogens as causative or as mere coincidental finding.

== Causes of idiopathic granulomatous mastitis ==
Causes are not known. The histology is suggestive of an autoimmune reaction. The high rate of relapses, as well as relatively high proportion of bilateral cases, is highly suggestive of a systemic predisposition. Presently most evidence points towards an important role of elevated prolactin levels or overt hyperprolactinemia with additional triggers such as local trauma or irritation. Alpha 1-antitrypsin deficiency was documented in one case and interferon-alpha therapy in another case. Similar cases of granulomatous mastitis were reported in IgG4-related disease though the exact relationship to IGM remains to be elucidated. Other contributing factors of IGM were investigated such as oral contraceptives usage. Many cases were reported after use of prolactin elevating medications such as antipsychotics.

Elevated prolactin levels have the direct effects of increasing secretory activity of breast lobules, maintaining tight junctions of the ductal epithelium, preventing involution of the breast gland after weaning and are known to stimulate the immune system. It contributes to both physiological and pathological granulomatous lesions and non-caseating granulomas. PRL is also secreted locally in the breast and local secretion by lymphocytes may be enhanced during inflammatory reactions. Autoimmune reaction to extravasated fat and protein rich luminal fluid (denaturized milk) resulting from the secretory activity is assumed to be one of the triggers of IGM. Several other hormones can contribute to PRL signalling in the breast gland. High levels of insulin caused, for example, by peripheral insulin resistance, resulting from pregnancy, gestational diabetes or developing diabetes mellitus type 2, will enhance the galactogenic and antiapoptotic effects of PRL and growth hormone by acting synergistically with IGF-1.

=== Microbiology ===
The presence of Corynebacterium in granulomatous mastitis was first reported in 1996. Since then multiple reports have confirmed the presence of this genus in granulomatous mastitis. The most commonly isolated species is Corynebacterium kroppenstedtii. A selective medium for the isolation of this species has been described. This organism, first isolated from human sputum in 1998, requires lipids for its growth which may help to explain its association with this condition.

== Treatment ==
Treatment protocols are not well established. Some sources report that approximately half of the patients will fully recover after a 2 – 24 month management.

One review recommended complete resection or corticosteroid therapy, stating also that long-term follow-up was indicated due to a high rate of recurrence. Treatment with steroids usually requires about 6 months. While some source report very good success with steroids, most report a considerable risk of recurrence after a treatment with steroids alone. Steroids are known to cause elevation of prolactin levels and increase risk of several conditions such as diabetes and other endocrinopathies, which in turn increase the risk of IGM. For surgical treatment, recurrence rates of 5 - 50% have been reported.

Treatment with a combination of glucocorticoids and prolactin lowering medications such as bromocriptine or cabergoline, was used with good success in Germany. Prolactin-lowering medication has also been reported to reduce the risk of recurrence. In cases of drug-induced hyperprolactinemia such as antipsychotics, prolactin-sparing medication can be tried.

Methotrexate alone or in combination with steroids has been used with good success. Its principal mechanism of action is immunomodulating activity, with a side effect profile that is more favorable for treating IGM.

Colchicine, azathioprine, and NSAIDs have also been used.
