= Areolar gland =

Oil glands around the nipple that promote breastfeeding

Areolar glands
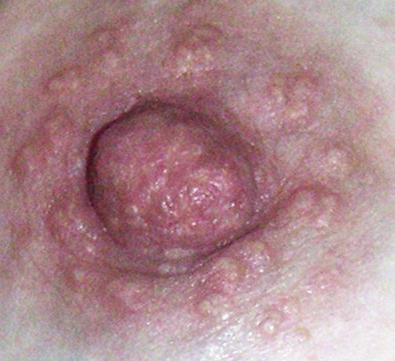
- The small bumps surrounding the nipple are areolar glands.

Details
- Function: Lubricate nipple, promote breastfeeding

Identifiers
- Latin: glandulae areolares
- TA98: A16.0.02.013
- TA2: 7107
- FMA: 58090

Areolar glands, also known as glandulae areolares, Montgomery glands, and tubercula areolae, are 10–15 elevations found on the areola. They are usually arranged in a circle around the nipple, and can be particularly visible when the nipple is erect. Their role is to promote adequate breastfeeding of the infant.

They are sebaceous glands, which secrete sebum oil, a free fatty acid, onto the skin that lubricates the nipple when breastfeeding, protects the skin, and provides some air tightness between the infant's mouth and the nipple. They also emit odor compounds into the air that attract babies.

In addition, a study of 121 white mothers found that higher numbers of areolar glands on the breasts (commonly known as AG number) was correlated with infants gaining weight faster and lactation beginning faster.

A meta-analysis shows that odor compounds emitted from lactating breasts reduced arousal states in active newborns, increases arousal states in sleepy newborns, and causes babies to turn their heads towards the breast, though the source of these effects were not strongly identified. A targeted study of 16 infants based on these observations has shown that these effects can be induced experimentally through a researcher directing a baby with areolar gland scent on a stick. Additionally, areolar gland scents cause these effects more strongly than milk or sebum odors.

== Structure ==
Areolar glands are round bumps found in the areola, and sometimes on the nipple.

=== Variation ===
The tubercles become more pronounced when the nipple is erect, and during pregnancy. The number of glands can vary greatly, usually averaging from 4 to 28 per breast.

== Function ==
Areolar glands make oily secretions (lipoid fluid) that keep the areola and the nipple lubricated and protected.

Volatile compounds in these secretions may also serve as an olfactory stimulus for newborn appetite.

Areolar glands, particularly during pregnancy and lactation, emit odors that reliably prompt newborns to turn toward the breast and locate the nipple. Cleaning the breast or masking these scents makes it more difficult for newborns to find the nipple and obtain their critical first drink of immunoprotective colostrum.

They can become exposed and raised when the nipple is stimulated. The skin over the surface opening is lubricated and tends to be smoother than the rest of the areola.

== Clinical significance ==
Areolar glands may secrete excessive amounts of oil. This is a neutral condition that rarely represents any underlying problem, unlike the spontaneous flow of milk from the breast.

== History ==
Areolar glands may also be called glands of Montgomery, or Montgomery tubercles. They are named after Dr. William Fetherstone Montgomery (1797–1859), an Irish obstetrician who first described them in 1837.

== See also ==
- Cracked nipple
- List of specialized glands within the human integumentary system
