= Breast engorgement =

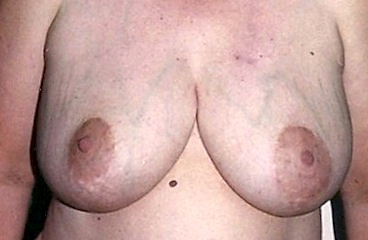
- Mature female breast engorged during nursing phase

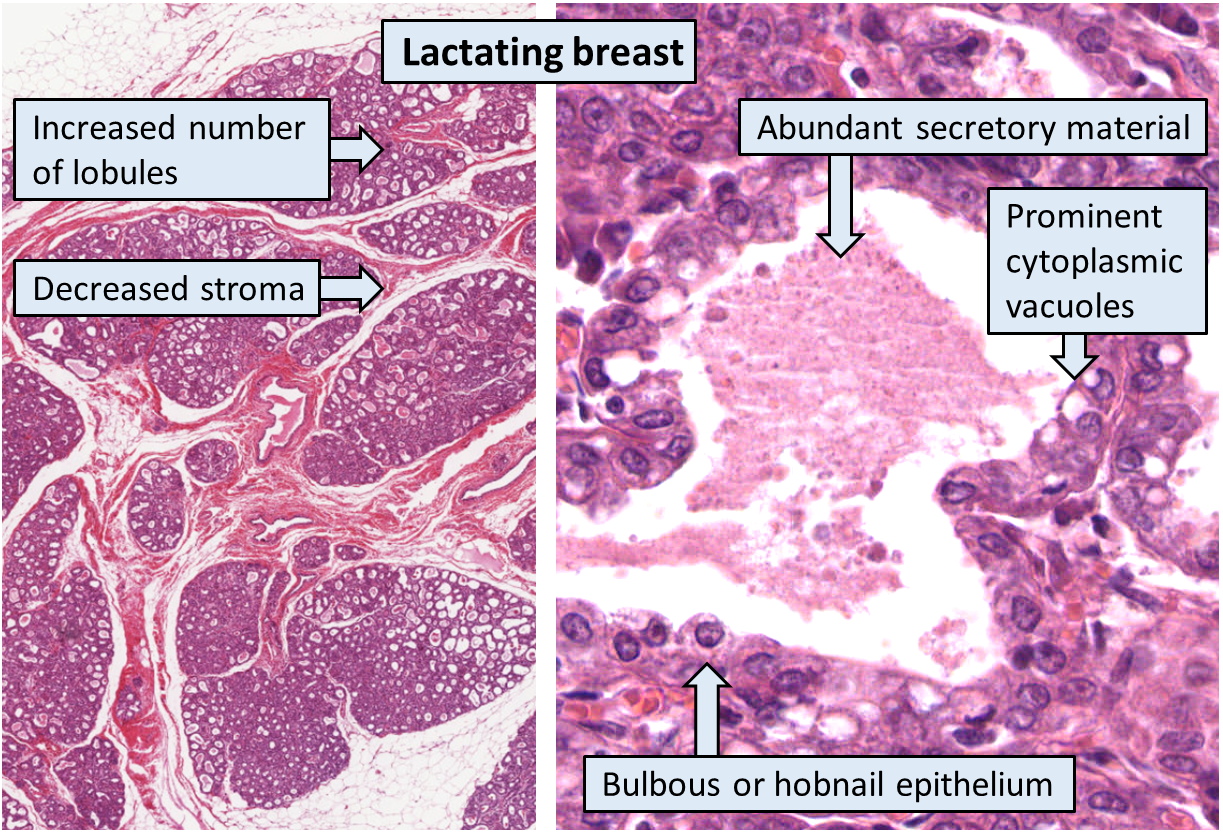
Normal histology of the breast during lactation

Breast engorgement occurs in the mammary glands due to expansion and pressure exerted by the synthesis and storage of breast milk. It is also a main factor in altering the ability of the infant to latch on. Engorgement changes the shape and curvature of the nipple region by making the breast inflexible, flat, hard, and swollen. The nipples on an engorged breast are flat or inverted. Sometimes it may lead to striae on nipples, mainly a preceding symptom of septation mastitis.

Engorgement usually happens when the breasts switch from colostrum to mature milk (often referred to as when the milk "comes in"). However, engorgement can also happen later if lactating women miss several nursings and not enough milk is expressed from the breasts. It can be exacerbated by insufficient breastfeeding and/or blocked milk ducts. When engorged, the breasts may swell, throb, and cause mild to extreme pain.

Engorgement may lead to mastitis (inflammation of the breast), and untreated engorgement puts pressure on the milk ducts, often causing a plugged duct. The woman will often feel a lump in one part of the breast, and the skin in that area may be red and/or warm. If it continues unchecked, the plugged duct can become a breast infection, at which point she may have a fever or flu-like symptoms.

== Signs and symptoms ==
Symptoms include the breasts being swollen and oedematous, and the skin appearing shiny and diffusely red. Usually, the whole of both breasts is affected, and they are painful. The woman may have a fever that usually subsides in 24 hours. The nipples may become stretched, tight, and flat, which makes it difficult for the baby to attach and remove the milk. The milk does not flow well.

A fever may occur in 15 percent, but is typically less than 39 degrees C and lasts for less than one day.

== Causes ==
Failure to remove breast milk, especially in the first few days after delivery when the milk comes in and fills the breast, and at the same time blood flow to the breasts increases, causing congestion. The common reasons why milk is not removed adequately are delayed initiation of breastfeeding, infrequent feeds, poor attachment, ineffective suckling, a sudden change in breastfeeding routine, suddenly stopping breastfeeding, or if a baby suddenly starts breastfeeding less than usual.

== Treatment ==
The mother must remove the breast milk. If the baby can attach well and suckle, then she should breastfeed as frequently as the baby is willing. If the baby is not able to attach and suckle effectively, she should express her milk by hand or with a pump a few times until the breasts are softer, so that the baby can attach better, and then get them to breastfeed frequently. She can apply warm compresses to the breast or take a warm shower before expressing, which helps the milk to flow. She can use cold compresses after feeding or expressing, which helps to reduce the oedema. Engorgement occurs less often in baby-friendly hospitals that practise the Ten Steps and help mothers to start breastfeeding soon after delivery.

Regular breastfeeding can and should be continued. Medical methods of treating engorged breasts are proteolytic enzymes such as serrapeptase, protease, and subcutaneous oxytocin. Cabbage leaves are often cited as a possible treatment, but studies have found they provide "no overall benefit" on breast engorgement. Evidence from published clinical trials on the effectiveness of treatment options is of weak quality and is not strong enough to justify a clinical recommendation.

Wearing a well-fitting nursing bra with wide straps and open cups that can comfortably support the entire breast can help relieve discomfort and other symptoms.

Entrapment occurs less frequently in baby-friendly hospitals that practice the Ten Steps and help mothers begin breastfeeding soon after birth.

== See also ==
- Galactorrhea
- Mammoplasia
