= Mastitis =

- Other names: mammitis; garget
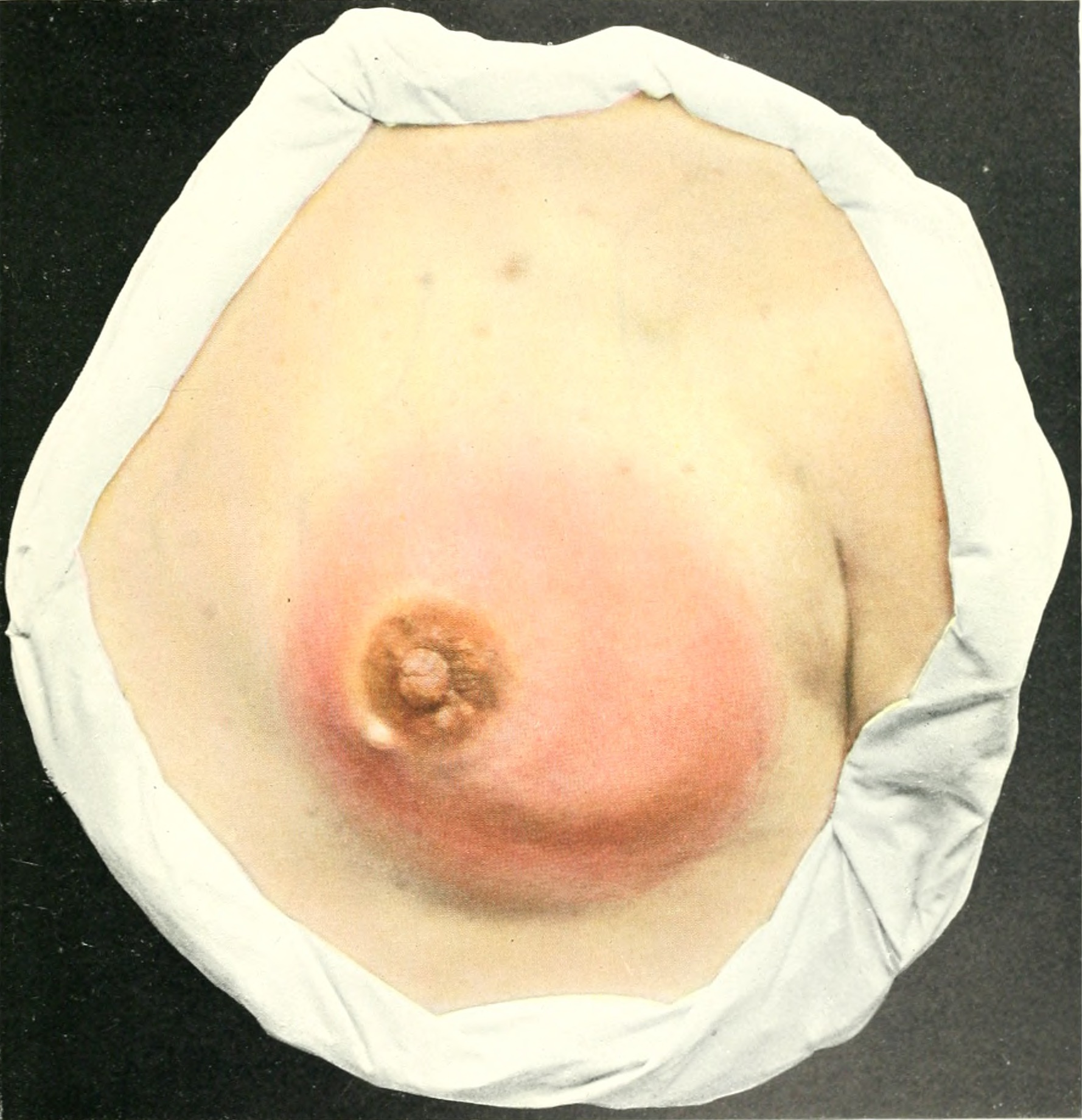
- Colorized photo illustrating mastitis, 1908
- Pronunciation: /mæstˈaɪtɪs/
- Specialty: Gynecology
- Symptoms: Localized breast pain and redness, fever
- Complications: Abscess
- Usual onset: Rapid
- Diagnostic method: Based on symptoms
- Differential diagnosis: Plugged milk duct, breast engorgement, breast cancer (rare)
- Prevention: Frequent breastfeeding with good technique
- Treatment: Antibiotics (cephalexin), ibuprofen
- Frequency: 10% of breastfeeding women

Mastitis is inflammation of the breast or udder, usually associated with breastfeeding. Symptoms typically include local pain and redness. There is often an associated fever and general soreness. Onset is typically fairly rapid and usually occurs within the first few months of delivery. Complications can include abscess formation.

Risk factors include poor latch, cracked nipples, and weaning. Use of a breast pump has historically been associated with mastitis, but has been determined as an indirect association. The bacteria most commonly involved is Staphylococcus aureus. Diagnosis is typically based on symptoms. Ultrasound may be useful for detecting a potential abscess.

Prevention of this breastfeeding difficulty is by proper breastfeeding techniques. When infection is present, antibiotics such as flucloxacillin (drug of choice) may be recommended. Breastfeeding should typically be continued, as emptying the breast is important for healing. Tentative evidence supports benefits from probiotics. About 10% of breastfeeding women are affected.

== Types ==
When it occurs in breastfeeding mothers, it is known as puerperal mastitis, lactation mastitis, or lactational mastitis. When it occurs in non breastfeeding women it is known as non-puerperal or non-lactational mastitis. Mastitis can, in rare cases, occur in men. Inflammatory breast cancer has symptoms very similar to mastitis and must be ruled out.

The symptoms are similar for puerperal and nonpuerperal mastitis but predisposing factors and treatment can be very different.

=== Pregnancy related ===
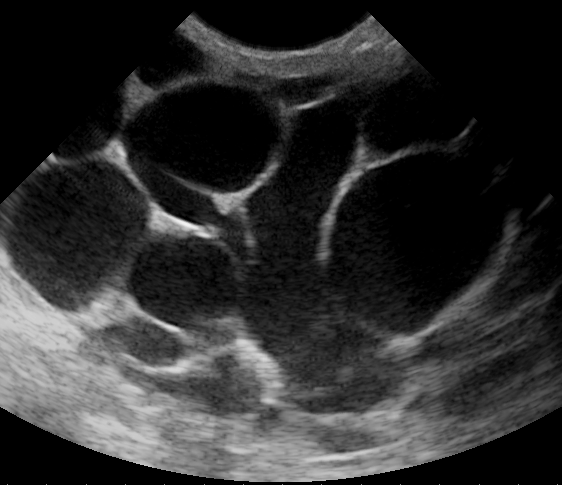
An ultrasound image of puerperal mastitis

Puerperal mastitis is the inflammation of the breast in connection with pregnancy, breastfeeding or weaning. Since one of the most prominent symptoms is tension and engorgement of the breast, it is thought to be caused by blocked milk ducts or milk excess. It is relatively common; estimates range depending on methodology between 5–33%. However, only about 0.4–0.5% of breastfeeding mothers develop an abscess.

Some predisposing factors are known but their predictive value is minimal. It appears that proper breastfeeding technique, frequent breastfeeding and avoidance of stress are the most important factors that can be influenced.

Light cases of mastitis are often called breast engorgement; the distinction is overlapping and possibly arbitrary or subject to regional variations.

=== Non-pregnancy related ===
The term nonpuerperal mastitis describes inflammatory lesions of the breast occurring unrelated to pregnancy and breastfeeding. This article includes description of mastitis as well as various kinds of mammary abscesses. Skin related conditions like dermatitis and foliculitis are a separate entity.

Names for non-puerperal mastitis are not used very consistently and include mastitis, subareolar abscess, duct ectasia, periductal inflammation, Zuska's disease and others.

Periductal mastitis is a form of nonlactational mastitis, and is characterized by inflammation of the subareolar ducts. Although the cause of periductal mastitis is currently unknown, it is predicted that smoking may be related. This condition is mainly seen in young women but can also be seen in men.

== Signs and symptoms ==
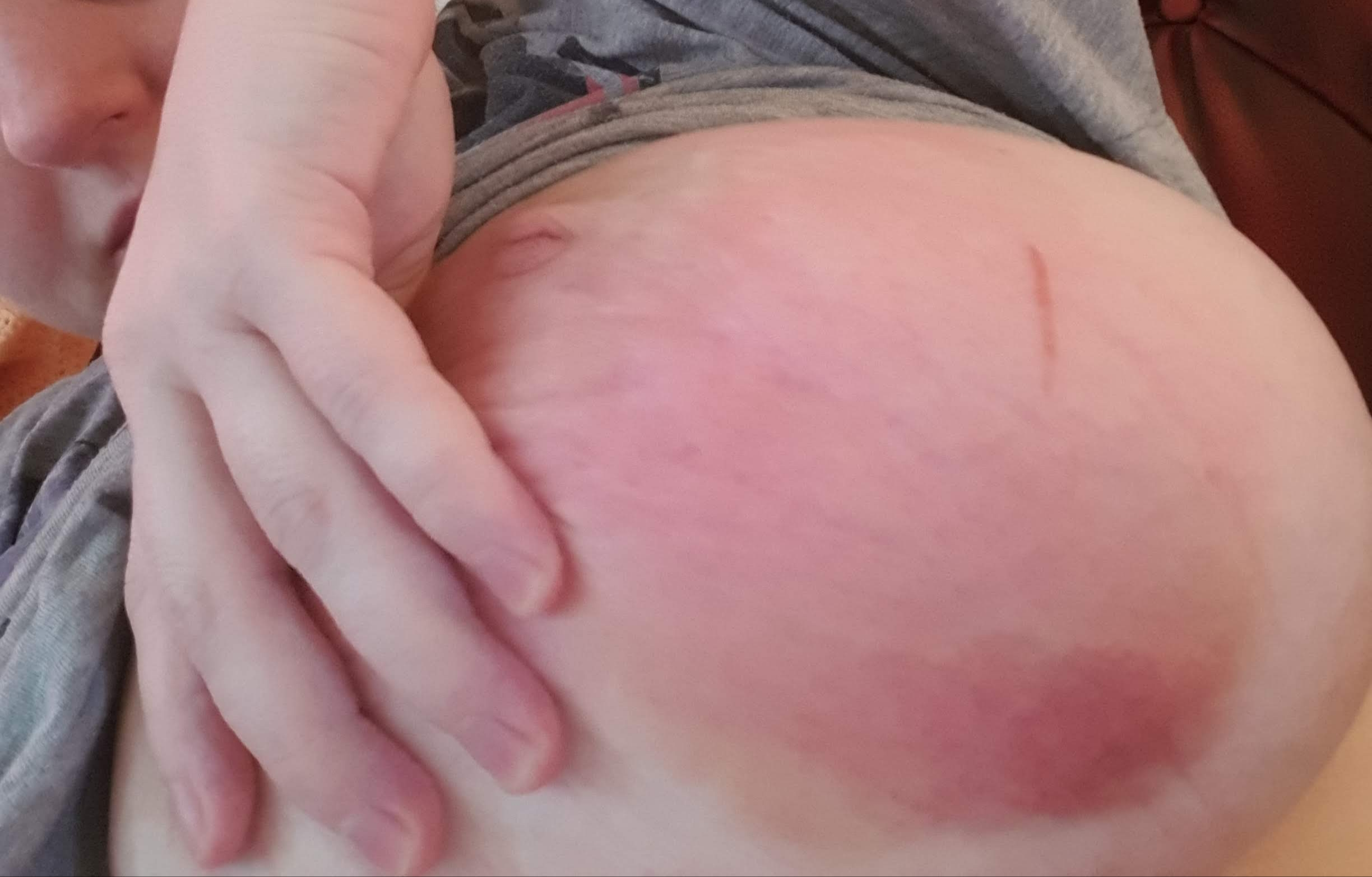
Mastitis localized on the underside of the breast, with a large area of inflammation

Lactation mastitis usually affects only one breast and the symptoms can develop quickly. It develops into three stages, from the initial stage, the pus formation stage, to the restoration stage. The signs and symptoms usually appear suddenly and they include:

- Breast tenderness or warmth to the touch
- General malaise or feeling ill
- Swelling of the breast
- Pain or a burning sensation continuously or while breast-feeding
- Skin redness, often in a wedge-shaped pattern
- Fever of 101 F (38.3 C) or greater
- The affected breast can then start to appear lumpy and red.

Some women may also experience flu-like symptoms such as:

- Aches
- Shivering and chills
- Feeling anxious or stressed
- Fatigue

Contact should be made with a health care provider with special breastfeeding competence as soon as the patient recognizes the combination of signs and symptoms. Most of the women first experience the flu-like symptoms and just after they may notice a sore red area on the breast. Also, women should seek medical care if they notice any abnormal discharge from the nipples, if breast pain is making it difficult to function each day, or they have prolonged, unexplained breast pain.

=== Breast abscess ===
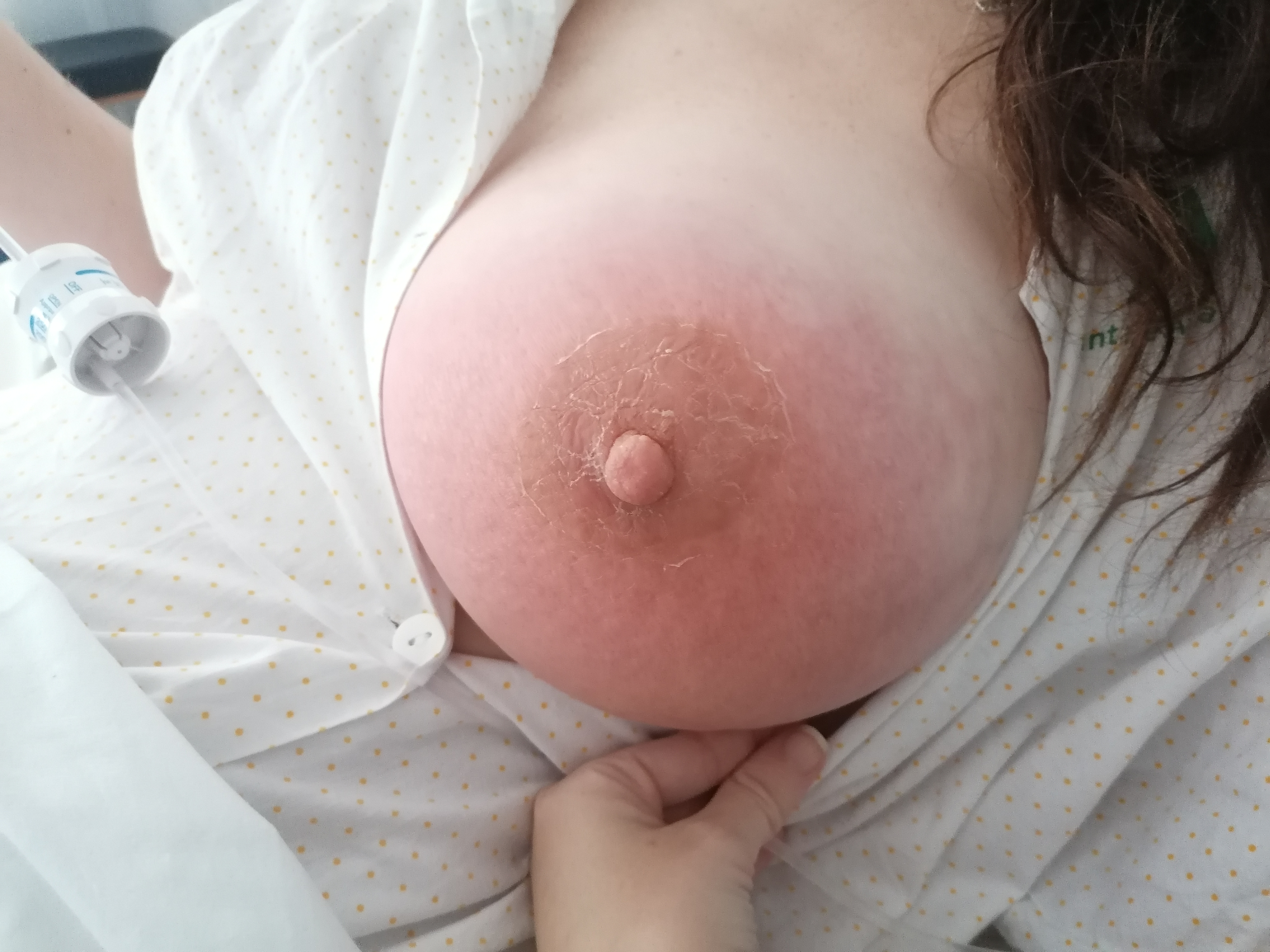
Breast with visible infection and inflammation, right before a surgical intervention for breast abscess

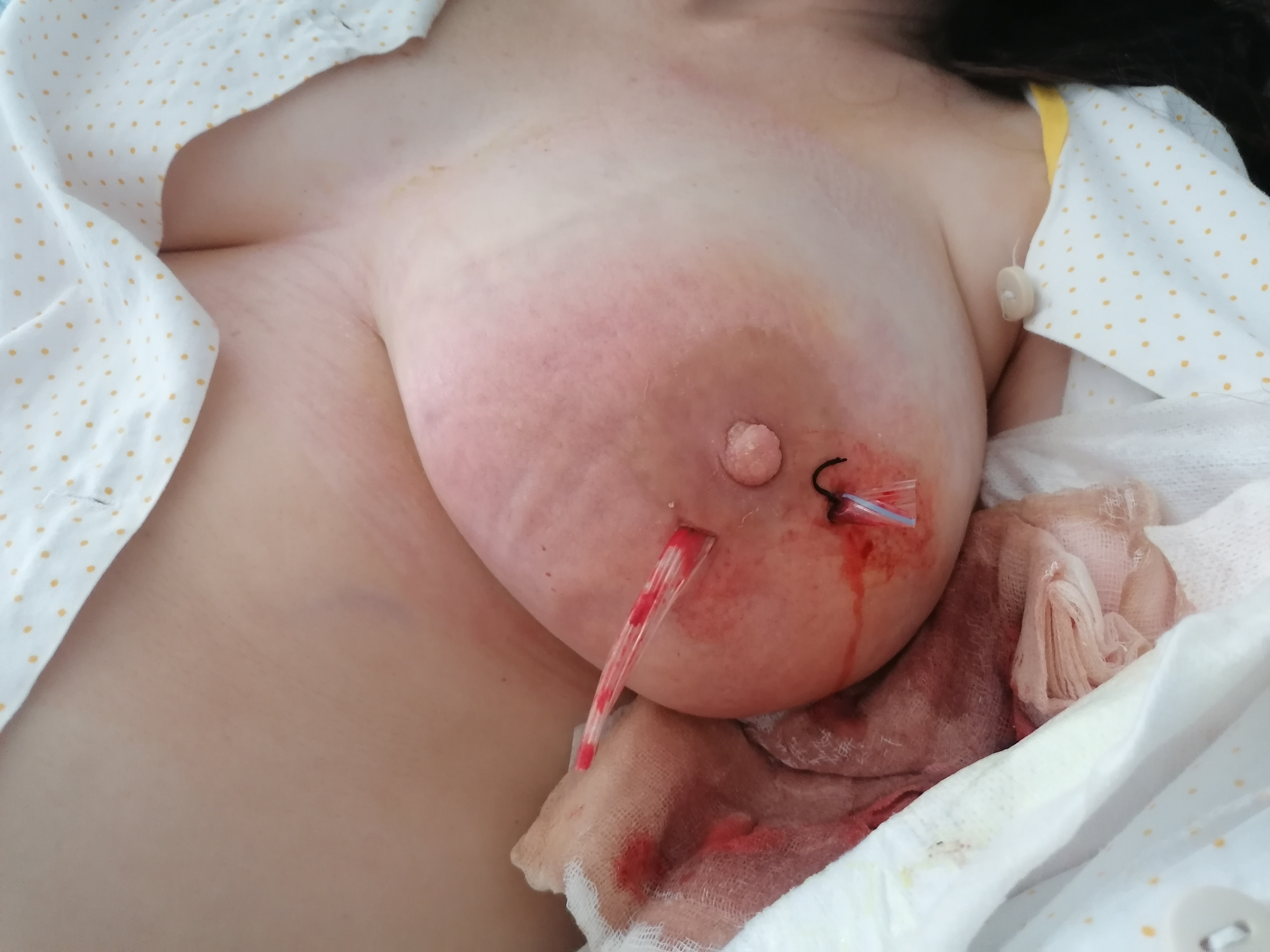
Breast right after surgical intervention for breast abscess

A breast abscess is a collection of pus that develops in the breast with several causes. During lactation, breast abscess develops only rarely, most sources cite about 0.4–0.5% of breastfeeding women. Known risk factors are age over 30, primiparous (first birth) and late delivery. No correlation was found with smoking status; however, this may be in part because far fewer smoking women choose to breastfeed. Antibiotics were not shown effective in prevention of lactation abscess but are useful to treat a secondary infection (see the section on the treatment of breast abscess in this article).

Keratinizing squamous metaplasia of lactiferous ducts may play a similar role in the pathogenesis of nonpuerperal subareolar abscess.

== Causes ==
Since the 1980s mastitis has often been divided into non-infectious and infectious sub-groups. However, recent research suggests that it may not be feasible to make divisions in this way. It has been shown that types and amounts of potentially pathogenic bacteria in breast milk are not correlated to the severity of symptoms. Moreover, although only 15% of women with mastitis in Kvist et al.'s study were given antibiotics, all recovered and few had recurring symptoms. Many healthy breastfeeding women wishing to donate breast milk have potentially pathogenic bacteria in their milk but have no symptoms of mastitis.

=== Risk factors ===
Mastitis typically develops when the milk is not properly removed from the breast. Milk stasis can lead to the milk ducts in the breasts becoming blocked, as the breast milk is not being properly and regularly expressed. It has also been suggested that blocked milk ducts can occur as a result of pressure on the breast, such as tight-fitting clothing or an over-restrictive bra, although there is sparse evidence for this supposition. Mastitis may occur when the baby is not appropriately attached to the breast while feeding, when the baby has infrequent feeds or has problems suckling the milk out of the breast.

The presence of cracks or sores on the nipples increases the likelihood of infection. There is a possibility that infants carrying infectious pathogens in their noses can infect their mothers; the clinical significance of this finding is still unknown.

Mastitis can also develop due to contamination of a breast implant or any other foreign body, for example after nipple piercing. In such cases, the removal of the foreign body is indicated.

Women who are breastfeeding are at risk for developing mastitis especially if they have sore or cracked nipples or have had mastitis before while breastfeeding another baby. Also, the chances of getting mastitis increases if women use only one position to breastfeed or wear a tight-fitting bra, which may restrict milk flow. Difficulties in getting a nursing infant to latch on to the breast can also increase the risk for mastitis.

Women with diabetes, chronic illness, AIDS, or an impaired immune system may be more susceptible to the development of mastitis.

=== Infection ===
Some women (approximately 15%) will require antibiotic treatment for infection which is usually caused by bacteria from the skin or the baby's mouth entering the milk ducts through skin lesions of the nipple or through the opening of the nipple. Infection is usually caused by Staphylococcus aureus. It can enter the infant's mouth via the postpartum bleeding, especially after changing a sanitary pad, through the mother's insufficiently washed hands during breastfeeding, and then penetrate the nipple from the infant's nasal and pharyngeal cavities. Infectious pathogens commonly associated with mastitis are Staphylococcus aureus, Streptococcus spp. and Gram-negative bacilli such as Escherichia coli. Salmonella spp., mycobacteria, and fungi such as Candida and Cryptococcus have been identified in rare instances.

Recent research suggests that infectious pathogens play a much smaller role in the pathogenesis than was commonly assumed only a few years ago. Most detected pathogens are very common species that are natural part of the breast fauna and simple detection of their presence is not sufficient to prove a causative role. Furthermore, there are indications that treatment with antibiotics may have minimal impact, and over-all there is insufficient evidence to confirm or refute the effectiveness of antibiotic therapy for treating lactational mastitis.

== Diagnosis ==
The diagnosis of mastitis and breast abscess can usually be made based on a physical examination. The doctor will also take into account the signs and symptoms of the condition.

However, if the doctor is not sure whether the mass is an abscess or a tumor, a breast ultrasound may be performed. The ultrasound provides a clear image of the breast tissue and may be helpful in distinguishing between simple mastitis and abscess or in diagnosing an abscess deep in the breast. The test consists of placing an ultrasound probe over the breast.

In cases of infectious mastitis, cultures may be needed in order to determine what type of organism is causing the infection. Cultures are helpful in deciding the specific type of antibiotics that will be used in curing the disease. These cultures may be taken either from the breast milk or of the material aspirated from an abscess.

Mammograms or breast biopsies are normally performed on women who do not respond to treatment or on non-breastfeeding women. This type of tests is sometimes ordered to exclude the possibility of a rare type of breast cancer which causes symptoms similar to those of mastitis.

=== Differential diagnosis ===
==== Perinatal mood and anxiety disorders ====
Some women who experience pain or other symptoms when breastfeeding, but who have no detectable signs of mastitis, may have a sensory processing disorder, postpartum depression, perinatal anxiety, dysphoric milk ejection reflex, an involuntary aversion to breastfeeding, or other mental health problems.

==== Breast cancer ====
Breast cancer may coincide with or mimic symptoms of mastitis. Only full resolution of symptoms and careful examination are sufficient to exclude the diagnosis of breast cancer.

The lifetime risk for breast cancer is significantly reduced for women who were pregnant and breastfeeding. Mastitis episodes do not appear to influence lifetime risk of breast cancer.

Mastitis does however cause great difficulties in diagnosis of breast cancer. Breast cancer may coincide with mastitis or develop shortly afterwards. All suspicious symptoms that do not completely disappear within 5 weeks must be investigated.

Breast cancer incidence during pregnancy and lactation is assumed to be the same as in controls. Course and prognosis are also very similar to age matched controls. However diagnosis during lactation is particularly problematic, often leading to delayed diagnosis and treatment.

Some data suggest that noninflammatory breast cancer incidence is increased within a year following episodes of nonpuerperal mastitis and special care is required for follow-up cancer prevention screening. So far only data from short term observation is available and total risk increase can not be judged. Because of the very short time between presentation of mastitis and breast cancer in this study it is considered very unlikely that the inflammation had any substantial role in carcinogenesis, rather it would appear that some precancerous lesions may increase the risk of inflammation (hyperplasia causing duct obstruction, hypersensitivity to cytokines or hormones) or the lesions may have common predisposing factors.

A very serious type of breast cancer called inflammatory breast cancer presents with similar symptoms as mastitis (both puerperal and nonpuerperal). It is the most aggressive type of breast cancer with the highest mortality rate. The inflammatory phenotype of IBC is thought to be mostly caused by invasion and blocking of dermal lymphatics, however it was recently shown that NF-κB target genes activation may significantly contribute to the inflammatory phenotype. Case reports show that inflammatory breast cancer symptoms can flare up following injury or inflammation making it even more likely to be mistaken for mastitis. Symptoms are also known to partially respond to progesterone and antibiotics, reaction to other common medications can not be ruled out at this point.

== Treatment ==
=== Lactational mastitis ===
When mastitis is associated with breastfeeding, the treatment has to balance short-term reduction of symptoms with solving the underlying problems that caused mastitis. For example, the Academy of Breastfeeding Medicine recommends against trying to "empty" the breasts, whether through pushing the baby to feed more or through using a breast pump. It may reduce the feeling of being full or swollen in the short term, at the cost of triggering milk oversupply, which can cause a mastitis recurrence in the coming days and weeks.

==== Self-care ====
For breastfeeding women with breast engorgement or light mastitis, using a warm compress may be comfortable. However, by increasing blood flow to the area, warm compresses make the symptoms worse for other women. A cool compresses can reduce edema (swelling) and pain. In traditional folk medicine, the breast was sometimes cooled by placing a cabbage leaf on the breast, but this is now more commonly done with an ice pack or a wet washcloth.

Gentle massage ("like petting a cat") may be comfortable and may reduce swelling. However, more aggressive rubbing can easily damage breast tissues that are already strained by mastitis, and that damage can increase swelling and pain. Excessive massage, like excessive use of a breast pump, may be a risk factor for recurrent mastitis.

Probiotics may or may not help, but they are believed not to be harmful. Over-the-counter nonsteroidal anti-inflammatory drugs, such as ibuprofen and paracetamol, may reduce inflammation.

==== Medical treatments ====
Antibiotics are appropriate only for bacterial mastitis, which may develop if non-infective mastitis does not improve. Antifungals are similarly only useful when a fungal infection, such as thrush, is present. Severe infections may require ordinary medical supportive care, such as intravenous fluids if the mother is unable to drink enough water or other fluids.

Therapeutic ultrasound may reduce swelling.

==== Ineffective and harmful treatments ====
The shape of swelling in a specific spot may make people suppose that the breasts contain simple tubes, and that one has become plugged. However, milk ducts are not simple tubes, and their interconnected anatomy makes it impossible for them to actually become plugged. Consequently, treatment does not include cutting, popping, or squeezing any so-called "plugged" ducts. There is no "plug" (e.g., of dried-out milk) to be removed. These localized swellings are usually caused by lymphatic congestion (non-milk body fluid accumulating in the breasts), alveolar edema (swelling in the part of the breast that produces milk), or mammary dysbiosis (changes to the breast's microbiome), which can cause some narrowing, but not plugging, at the microscopic level. Breastfeeding at a normal level may provide temporary relief from the swelling without triggering milk oversupply. It is safer to treat nipple blebs (very small, usually pale colored, bumps of tissue on the end of the nipple) with topical steroids than by cutting the skin.

Any action that breaks the skin can cause an infection, which increases inflammation and may become serious.

Antibiotics do not prevent mastitis from recurring.

=== Nonpuerperal mastitis ===
Nonpuerperal mastitis is treated by medication and possibly aspiration or drainage (see in particular treatment of subareolar abscess and treatment of granulomatous mastitis). According to a BMJ best practice report, antibiotics are generally to be used in all mastitis cases unrelated to breastfeeding, with replacement of the antibiotics by an antifungal agent such as fluconazole in cases of deep fungal infections, and corticosteroids are to be used in case of granulomatous mastitis (with differential diagnosis to tuberculosis infection of the breast).

In idiopathic granulomatous mastitis, successful treatment includes invasive surgical procedures or less invasive treatment with steroid medications.

=== Antibiotics for bacterial mastitis ===
In lactational mastitis, antibiotics are not needed in the overwhelming majority of cases and should be used only for bacterial infections. For people with non-severe infections, dicloxacillin or cephalexin are recommended. For people with severe infections, vancomycin is recommended. The length of antibiotic treatment ranges anywhere from 5–14 days. The effects of antibiotics has not been well studied as of 2013.

A lactational phlegmon (area of inflammation) should be monitored for possible development into an abscess (walled-off area filled with pus from an infection).

=== Breast abscess ===
An abscess (or suspected abscess) in the breast may be treated by ultrasound-guided fine-needle aspiration (percutaneous aspiration) or by surgical incision and drainage; each of these approaches is performed under antibiotic coverage. In case of puerperal breast abscess, breastfeeding from the affected breast should be continued where possible.

For small breast abscesses, ultrasound-guided fine needle aspiration such as to completely drain the abscess is widely recognized as a preferred initial management.

One recommended treatment includes antibiotics, ultrasound evaluation and, if fluid is present, ultrasound-guided fine needle aspiration of the abscess with an 18 gauge needle, under saline lavage until clear. The exudate is then sent for microbiological analysis for identification of the pathogen and determination of its antibiotic sensitivity profile, which may in turn give an indication for changing the antibiotics. At follow-up, a mammography is performed if the condition has resolved; otherwise the ultrasound-guided fine-needle aspiration with lavage and microbiological analysis is repeated. If three to five aspirations still do not resolve the condition, percutaneous drainage in combination with placement of an indwelling catheter is indicated, and only if several attempts at ultrasound-guided drainage fail, surgical resection of the inflamed lactiferous ducts (preferably performed after the acute episode is over). It is noted, however, that even the excision of the affected ducts does not necessarily prevent recurrence.

Nonpuerperal breast abscesses have a higher rate of recurrence compared to puerperal breast abscesses. There is a high statistical correlation of nonpuerperal breast abscess with diabetes mellitus (DM). On this basis, it has recently been suggested that diabetes screening should be performed on patients with such abscess.

Although there are a number of recommendations regarding the treatment of breast abscesses, a 2015 review found insufficient evidence of whether needle aspiration is comparable to incision and drainage, or whether antibiotics should generally be given to women undergoing incision and drainage.

== Prevention ==
Most efforts to prevent mastitis in breastfeeding women are believed to be ineffective or have a relatively small effect. Acupoint massage probably reduces the risk somewhat. Possibly effective prevention measures include taking probiotics, breast massage, and low-frequency pulse treatment. Ineffective methods included prophylactic antibiotics, topical treatments (mastitis is inflammation deep in the breast, so treating the skin is irrelevant), specialist breastfeeding education, and anti‐secretory factor‐inducing cereal.

== Prognosis ==
Neither the presence of a fever nor the severity of symptoms at presentation do not predict outcome; women with sore or damaged nipples may need special attention.

== Epidemiology ==
Mastitis is quite common among breastfeeding women. The WHO estimates that although incidences vary between 2.6% and 33%, the prevalence globally is approximately 10% of breastfeeding women. Most mothers who develop mastitis usually do so within the first few weeks after delivery. Most breast infections occur within the first or second month after delivery or at the time of weaning. However, in rare cases it affects women who are not breastfeeding.

== Terminology ==
Popular usage of the term mastitis varies by geographic region. Outside the US, it is commonly used for both puerperal (that is, occurring to breastfeeding mothers) and nonpuerperal (unrelated to breastfeeding) cases. In the US, mastitis usually refers to puerperal mastitis with fever or other symptoms of systemic infection (these symptoms are not necessarily caused by an actual infection). Lighter cases of puerperal mastitis, appearing a few days after birth, are often called breast engorgement. In the US, the term nonpuerperal mastitis is rarely used, and alternative names such as duct ectasia, subareolar abscess and plasma cell mastitis are more frequently used.

In this article, mastitis is used in the original sense of the definition as inflammation of the breast, with additional qualifiers where appropriate.

Chronic cystic mastitis is an older name for fibrocystic breast changes.

=== Etymology and pronunciation ===
The word mastitis (/mæstˈaɪtɪs/) uses combining forms of mast- + -itis. The word mammitis (/mæmˈaɪtɪs/) uses combining forms of mamm- + -itis. They are synonymous in modern usage, and mastitis is the more commonly used synonym.

== Other animals ==
Mastitis occurs in other animals as in humans, and is especially a concern in livestock, since milk from the affected udders of livestock may enter the food supply and pose a health risk.

It is a major condition in some species, like dairy cows. It is the cause of much unwanted suffering for the dairy cows. It is of tremendous economic importance for the dairy industry, and it is also of concern for public health. The same considerations apply to mastitis in sheep and goats and other milk-producing females. It is also of economic importance in the sow, but, in this species, it is not related to public health. In other domestic females (queen, mare, etc.), it is more an individual illness dealt with by veterinary practitioners.

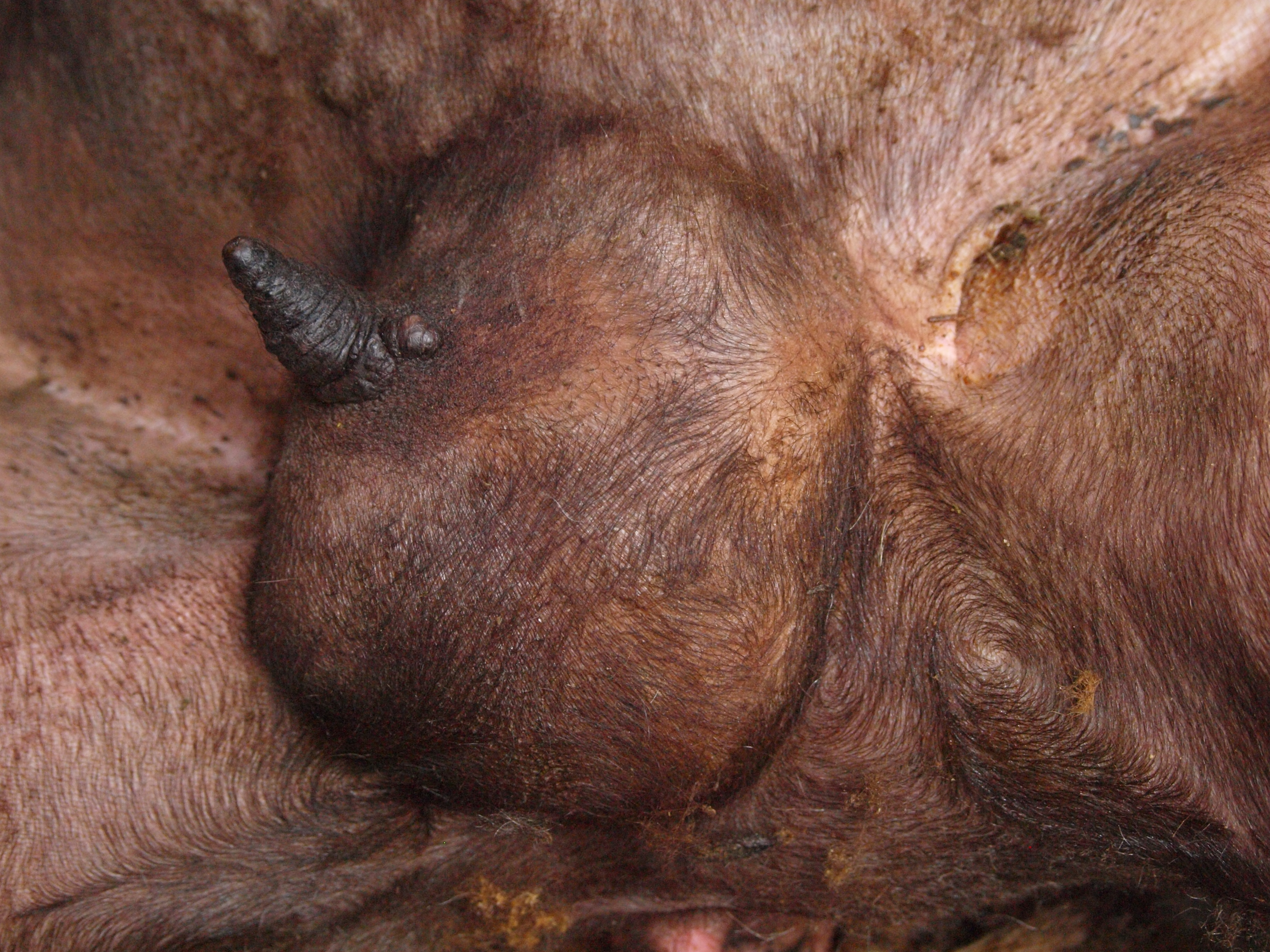
Udder of a Roux du Valais sheep after a healed mastitis; one teat was lost due to the disease.

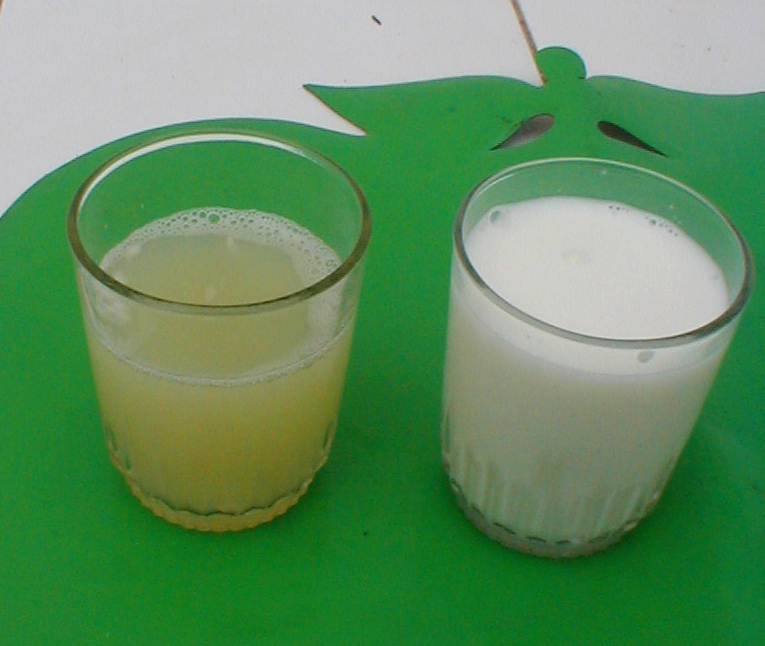
Serous exudate from bovine udder in E. coli mastitis at left. Normal milk at right.

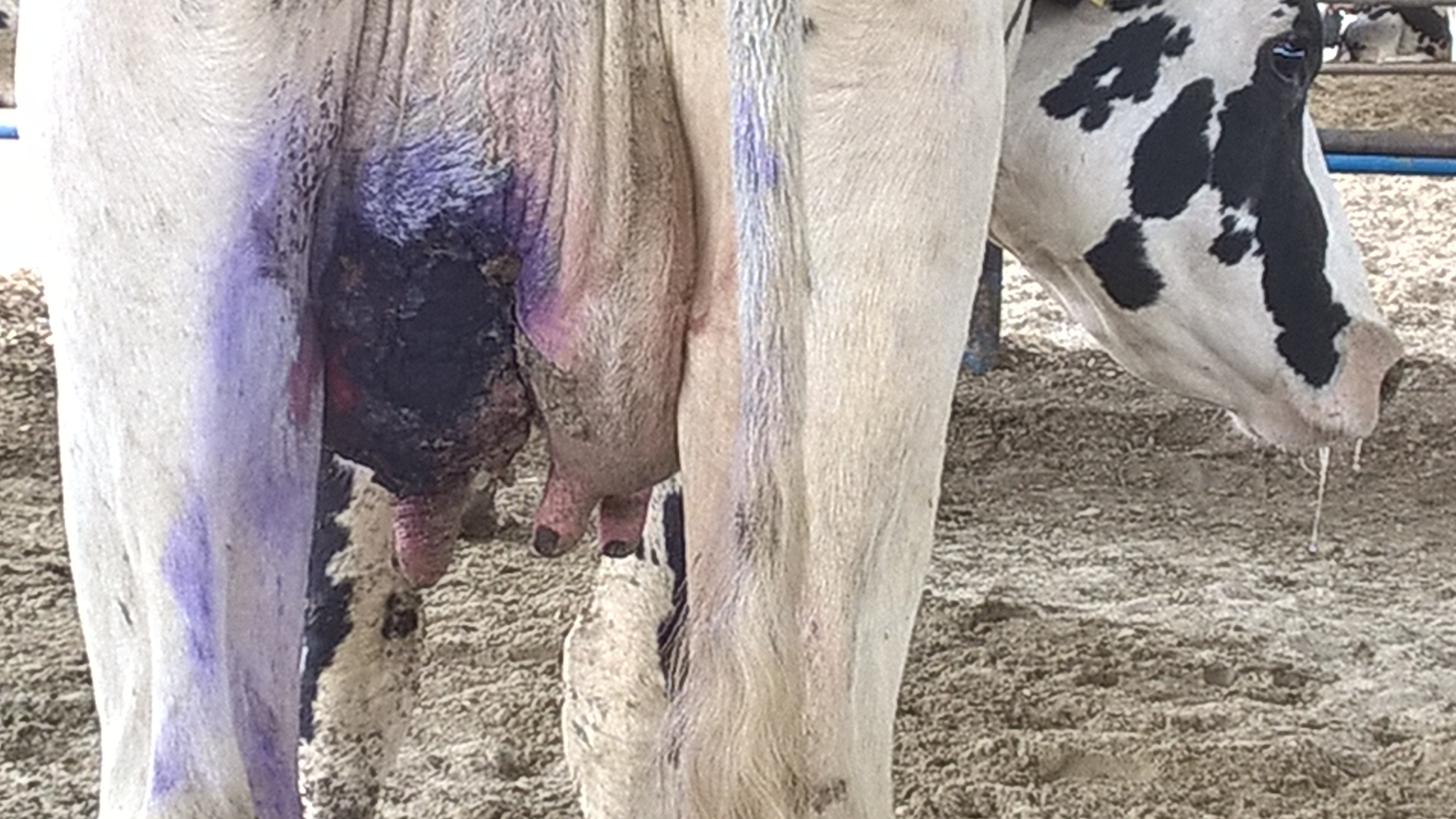
Gangrenous mastitis in a dairy cow

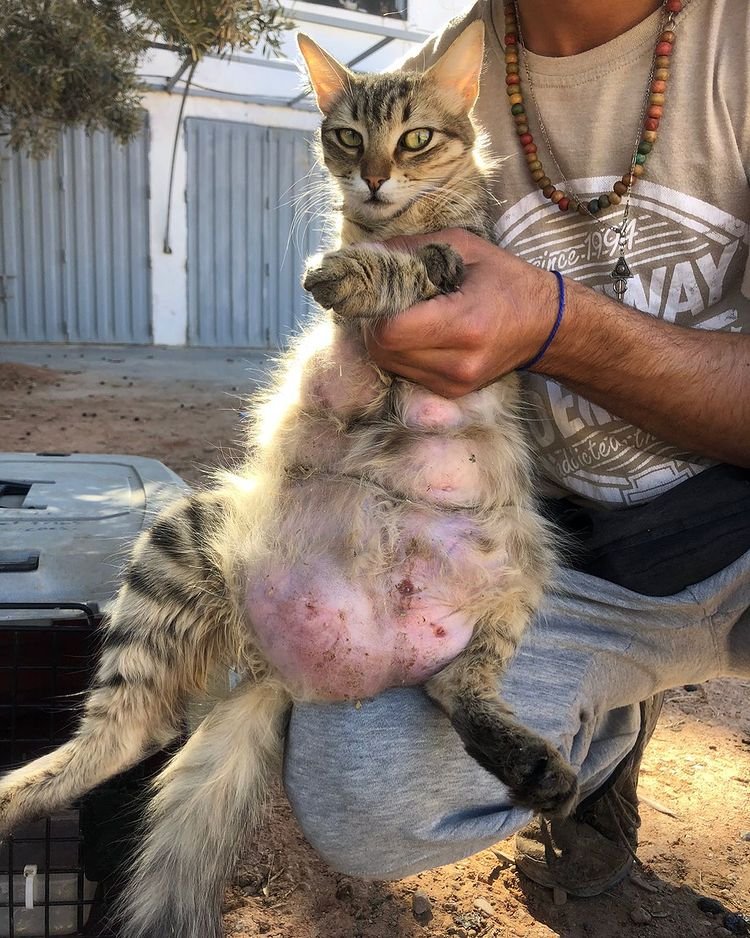
Cat with mastitis

== See also ==
- Galactocele, a milk-filled cyst
