= Peau d'orange =

Anatomy with the texture of an orange peel

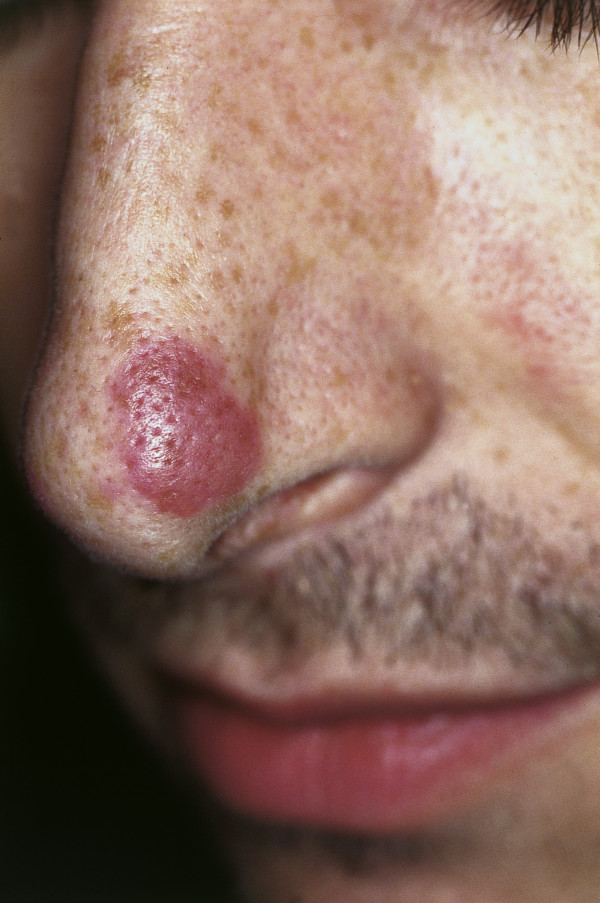
A facial eosinophilic granuloma demonstrating "peau d'orange"

Peau d'orange (French for "orange peel skin" or, more literally, "skin of an orange") describes a phenomenon in which hair follicles become buried in edema, giving the skin an orange peel appearance. Peau d'orange can be caused by cutaneous lymphatic edema, which causes swelling. Parts of the edematous sky are tethered by hair follicles and sweat glands such that pinpoint pitting occurs within areas of swelling, leading to the characteristic appearance. Causes of peau d'orange include cellulite, infection, pseudoxanthoma elasticum, inflammatory breast cancer, and Graves' dermopathy.

Inflammatory breast cancer with peau d'orange

Peau d'orange on the breast should raise concerns of possible underlying inflammatory breast cancer, a rare and aggressive form of breast cancer.

Other examples of peau d'orange occur in the eye due to breaks in Bruch's Membrane called angioid streaks, which are common in pseudoxanthoma elasticum, or in elephantiasis caused by thread-like, microscopic parasitic worms (filariasis). Peau d'orange can also be used to describe the dermopathy seen in the pretibial myxedema of Graves' disease, in which the ankles and shins become swollen and red along with the characteristic orange peel texture.
