= Supernumerary nipples–uropathies–Becker's nevus syndrome =

- Other names: SNUB syndrome
- Specialty: Dermatology
- Symptoms: Supernumerary nipple, uropathies, Becker's nevus
- Usual onset: Childhood
- Treatment: Dermabrasion, laser treatments, makeup

Supernumerary nipples–uropathies–Becker's nevus syndrome (also known as "SNUB syndrome") is a skin condition that may be associated with genitourinary tract abnormalities. Supernumerary nipples, also referred to as polythelia or accessory nipples, is a pigmented lesion of the skin that is present at birth. This pigmentation usually occurs along the milk lines, which are the precursors to breast and nipple development. Clinically, this congenital condition is generally considered benign, but some studies have suggested there may be an association with kidney diseases and cancers of the urogenital system.

Becker's nevus typically presents as a unilateral, non-cancerous patch of skin that is hyperpigmented and has excessive hair, often occurring on the chest, shoulder, and back. The term "Becker's nevus syndrome" is used to describe Becker's nevus occurring along with other skin, musculoskeletal, or other tissue abnormalities such as supernumerary nipples. There are some reports documenting an association between supernumerary nipples, Becker's nevus syndrome, and urinary tract abnormalities, although with conflicting results. This association has been dubbed "SNUB syndrome".

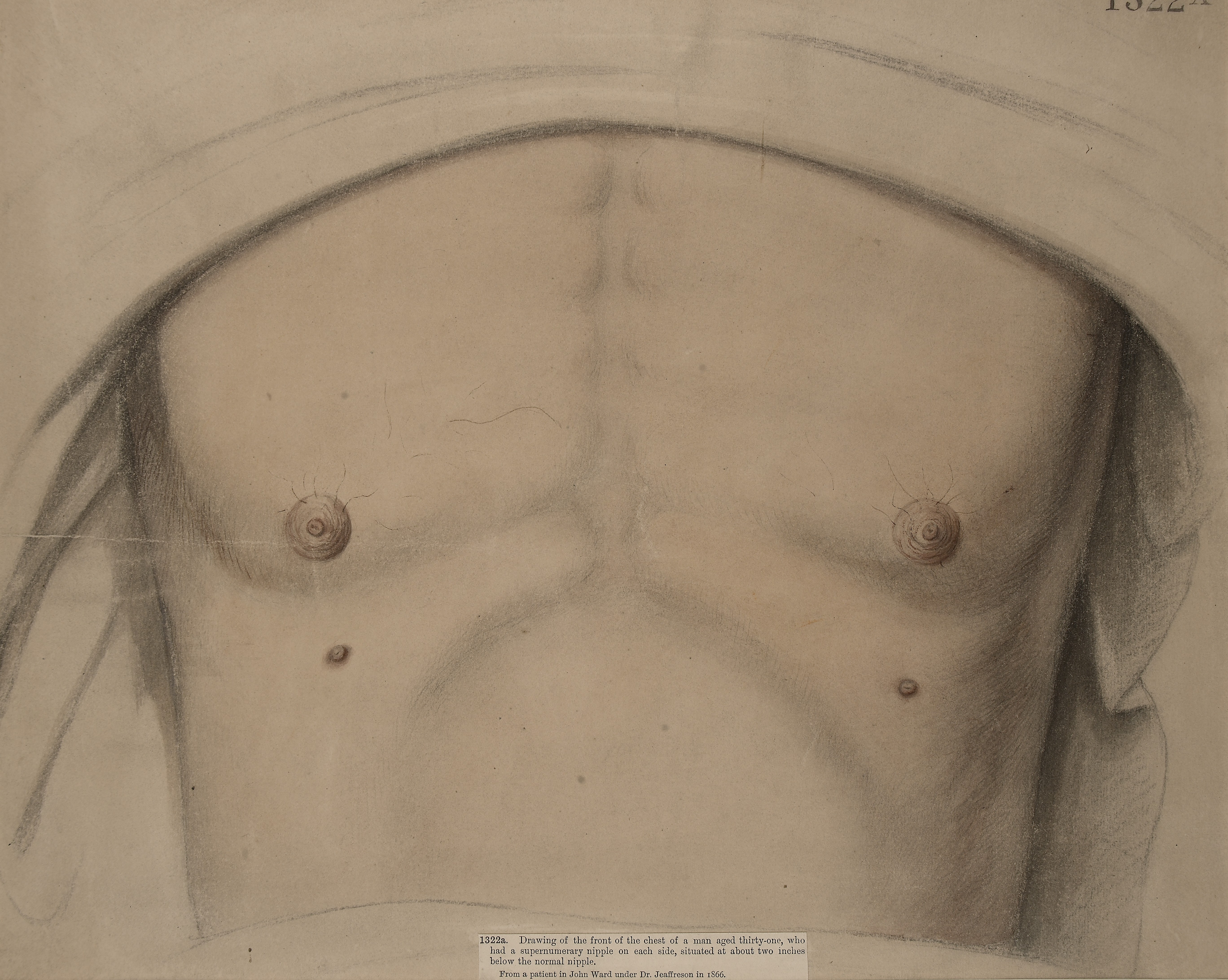
Drawing of a man with supernumerary nipples

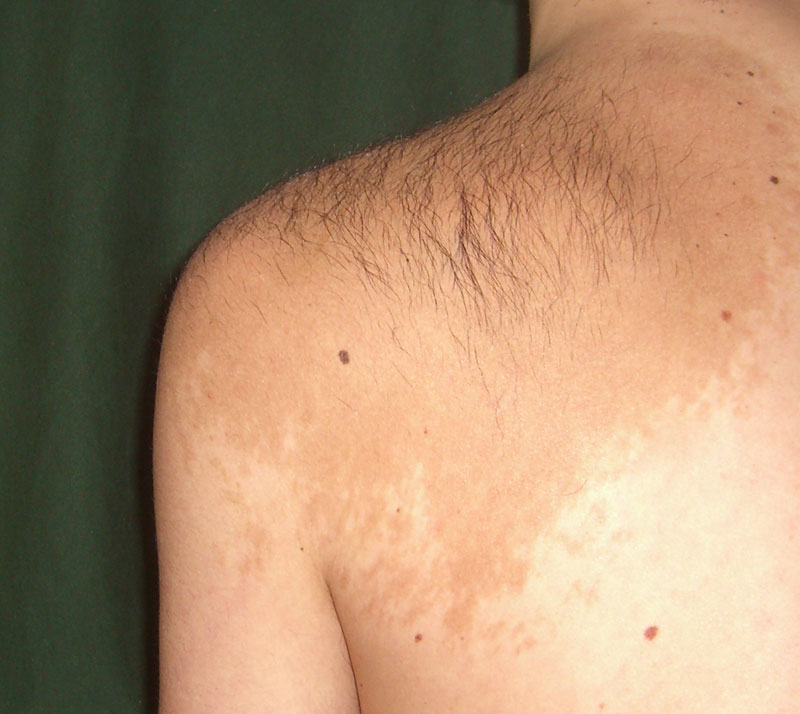
Becker's nevus on left shoulder & back

== Classification ==
One factor that distinguishes supernumerary nipples from other skin lesions is that it has the histology of breast tissue, so it falls under the umbrella term of accessory breast tissue (ABT). Accessory breast tissue has a classification system depending on how the condition presents in the individual. Separate terms are used for different combinations of the presence of nipple, areola, or glandular tissue. The most common presentation, termed polythelia, is where only the nipple is present without the areola and glandular tissue. Conversely, the presence of all three components is known as polymastia, or supernumerary breasts.

SNUB syndrome may be considered part of the broader category of epidermal nevus syndromes, which is described as the presence of any type of epidermal nevus together with other developmental abnormalities in the skin, eyes, brain, heart, skeletal system, or urinary or genital systems.

== Signs and symptoms ==
Individuals with SNUB syndrome will have the characteristic symptoms of Becker's Nevus, supernumerary nipples, and some type of uropathy.

Becker's nevus presents as a tan or brown patch of skin that most often occurs on chest, shoulder blade, or back, although it can occur on other parts of the body. This patch of skin can develop excess growth of coarse, dark hair years after the discoloration is first discovered. The term Becker's nevus syndrome is used when an individual has a Becker's Nevus along with other developmental abnormalities. The most common abnormality is ipsilateral breast hypoplasia, where the breasts are asymmetrical in size, shape, or placement. Other abnormalities can include scoliosis, fused ribs, asymmetry in other muscles, and supernumerary nipples. When Becker's nevus syndrome presents specifically with supernumerary nipples and urogenital abnormalities, it may be referred to as SNUB syndrome.

Supernumerary nipples are presented in any shape and size along the milk line at birth, and it affects more males than females. They commonly present as 2-3 mm hyper-pigmented spots below the breast, chest, or abdomen at birth. However, they can also occur on the face, neck and back. Supernumerary nipples can start growing by responding to hormone changes during adolescence, and can produce milk during pregnancy. Supernumerary nipples may be associated with kidney and vertebral malformation.

There is a wide range of kidney and urinary tract abnormalities reported to be associated with Becker's nevus or supernumerary nipples. However, whether there is a true association between uropathies, Becker's nevus, and supernumerary nipples is debated in the literature.

== Causes ==
Supernumerary nipples is a rare congenital disease that may happen in both females and males. During human embryologic development, groups of cells known as ectodermal clusters grow along the milk lines to form breasts. In normal development, two ectodermal clusters will form breasts; the rest of the ectodermal clusters will regress. If the rest of the ectodermal clusters continue growing, they will form accessory nipples. The cause of Becker's nevus is not well known yet. It is thought to be a congenital condition, but the appearance of the nevus can also be influenced by intense sun exposure or an individual's androgen levels. The Becker's nevus will often become more obvious during puberty, especially in male individuals. Other studies suggest it may relate to a genetic mutation of beta-actin. Although some studies describe the association between supernumerary nipples, Becker's nevus, and urinary tract abnormalities as "SNUB syndrome", there is no clear causal relationship between the three conditions.

== Diagnosis ==
Because of the rarity of SNUB syndrome, diagnostic methods for this particular syndrome have not been thoroughly described in the literature. Therefore, this section will describe diagnostic methods used for epidermal nevus syndromes, and Becker's nevus syndrome in particular.

=== Skin biopsy ===
Becker's nevus and supernumerary nipples can usually be diagnosed by visually observing the skin. However, if visual observation alone is insufficient to make a conclusive diagnosis, a skin biopsy can be performed. A small sample of skin can be removed from the nevus and examined under a microscope to analyze the cellular components. Epidermal nevi will typically contain an abnormal overgrowth of keratin-producing cells, sweat glands, and hair follicles. There is also typically increased levels of melanin in the innermost layer of the skin, causing the darker discoloration.

=== Urinary system evaluation ===
Ultrasound, CT scans, and other imaging technology can be used to evaluate for kidney or bladder cancers. Urinalysis can also be performed on urine samples to evaluate for other urinary tract problems, such as hematuria.

== Treatment ==
Since supernumerary nipples are commonly regarded as benign, treatment to remove it is usually done only for cosmetic purposes. In some cases, this skin abnormality can also cause discomfort around the breast tissue. This is particularly an issue when a component of the lesion is glandular tissue, which can cause tenderness during puberty, and occasionally lactation. Although studies are still being done to establish an association between supernumerary nipples and kidney diseases, some researchers have proposed that renal ultrasounds be used as a precautionary measure to detect any kidney abnormalities in this population and identify a need for treatment.

Cosmetically treating Becker's nevus syndrome focuses on the hyperpigmentation and hair growth. Correcting skin pigmentation can be done through a variety of methods including the use of makeup, dermabrasion, or laser treatments. Studies have also established that the tissue of Becker's nevus has an increased number of androgen receptors compared to the unaffected skin. Consequently, treatments using drugs with anti-androgenic properties have shown efficacy in reducing the pigmentation. Particularly, spironolactone and topical flutamide are some examples which have been studied. Likewise, the excessive hair growth can be resolved by shaving, waxing, and electrology. Other treatments of note are Q-switched laser and intense pulsed light treatments, which are preferred for longer term effects. Proper diagnoses of the lesion can help to determine which treatment is appropriate, as well as reduce the risk of recurrence and side effects from the aforementioned procedures, such as post-inflammatory hyperpigmentation.

Laser treatments may be pursued after careful consideration. In case the nevus is associated with another disease state, the affected area would no longer be available for histological examination after laser removal.

== Clinical studies and case reports ==
Genitourinary tumors, such as kidney or bladder cancers, have been reported to occur earlier in life and more often in individuals with epidermal nevus syndrome. However, there have not been sufficient controlled clinical studies to confirm the association between epidermal nevi and kidney and urinary tract abnormalities. On the other hand, studies on supernumerary nipples have found an association between supernumerary nipples between kidney and urinary tract abnormalities. While the prevalence of urinary tract abnormalities is about 1-2% in the general population, the frequency can rise to about 14.5% in individuals with supernumerary nipples.

=== SNUB and urogenital abnormalities ===
The urogenital abnormalities seen with SNUB syndrome are more difficult to characterize, since very few studies have investigated individuals with all three symptoms (Becker's nevus, supernumerary nipples, uropathy). One study found multiple cases of children with Becker's nevus and supernumerary nipples, with one of those children also having polycystic kidney disease. Another child had Becker's nevus but no supernumerary nipples but had Wilm's tumor (kidney cancer). Some studies on supernumerary nipples have found associations with a myriad of kidney and urinary tract abnormalities, including polycystic kidney diseases, hereditary renal cysts, and narrowing of the ureter tube. Patients with cancer of the urinary or genital systems have also been reported to have higher rates of supernumerary nipples.

=== Polythelia and genitourinary abnormalities ===
The association between polythelia and urinary tract abnormalities has not been fully established yet in either adults or children. In some clinical studies, the presence of polythelia or supernumerary nipples is an indication of the presence of nephro-uropathies in children, and in others, an association between the two has not been proven to be statistically significant. Studies have yet to show the association (or no association) in adults, but the majority have been linked to children.

The correlation between the accessory nipples and renal abnormalities was first introduced by K. Mehes in 1979 in a study of 20 children with polythelia. In this study, eight out of the twenty children had kidney lesions, proving statistically significant data and concluded an association between supernumerary nipples and renal abnormalities.

In 1996, a study published by C. Urbani and R. Betti evaluated accessory mammary tissue (AMT) association with hereditary urinary and kidney abnormalities. Their study aimed to determine the significance of the association in the adult population since previous controlled studies were only based on newborns and children. They enrolled 146 white patients (men and women) with AMT out of a total of 2645 patients. 11 patients with AMT were found to have kidney and urinary tract abnormalities. The study concluded that multiple factors are of importance in the determination of an association. These factors include age, race, ethnic group, hypertension, alcoholism and recently embryonic development defects. They found that there was a significantly higher occurrence of kidney and urinary abnormalities in patients with AMT compared to the control group, but no association or correlation was concluded between them.

In addition to clinical study findings, many published case reports have identified the presence (or absence) of kidney and renal abnormalities in patients with polythelia and familial polythelia. In one case report by A. Leung, renal abnormalities were found in a Chinese father with polythelia, but no kidney/urinary tract abnormalities were found in his twin daughters' renal ultrasounds. Another case report by Hersh, recorded significant renal abnormalities in a family with polythelia. Both mother and daughter had significant renal cysts. These case reports provide controversial data regarding the association between polythelia and kidney/urinary tract abnormalities.

While these clinical studies and case reports provide controversial conclusions, the presence of polythelia in patients warrants physicians to be vigilant in their examinations and perform the necessary tests for kidney/urinary tract abnormality detections early in the course of their diagnosis.

== Epidemiology ==
The epidemiology of SNUB syndrome has not been thoroughly described in the literature, so this section will discuss the epidemiology of supernumerary nipples and Becker's nevus as separate conditions.

Supernumerary nipples have an incidence of 2-5.6%, occurring more commonly in males.

Epidermal nevi, such as Becker's nevus, have an incidence of about 0.1%, appearing equally in males and females. A majority of epidermal nevi appear during childhood and adolescence, with 80% appearing before age 1. New epidermal nevi rarely occur in adults.

== See also ==
- Silver–Russell syndrome
- List of cutaneous conditions
