= Mammary gland =

Exocrine gland in humans and other mammals

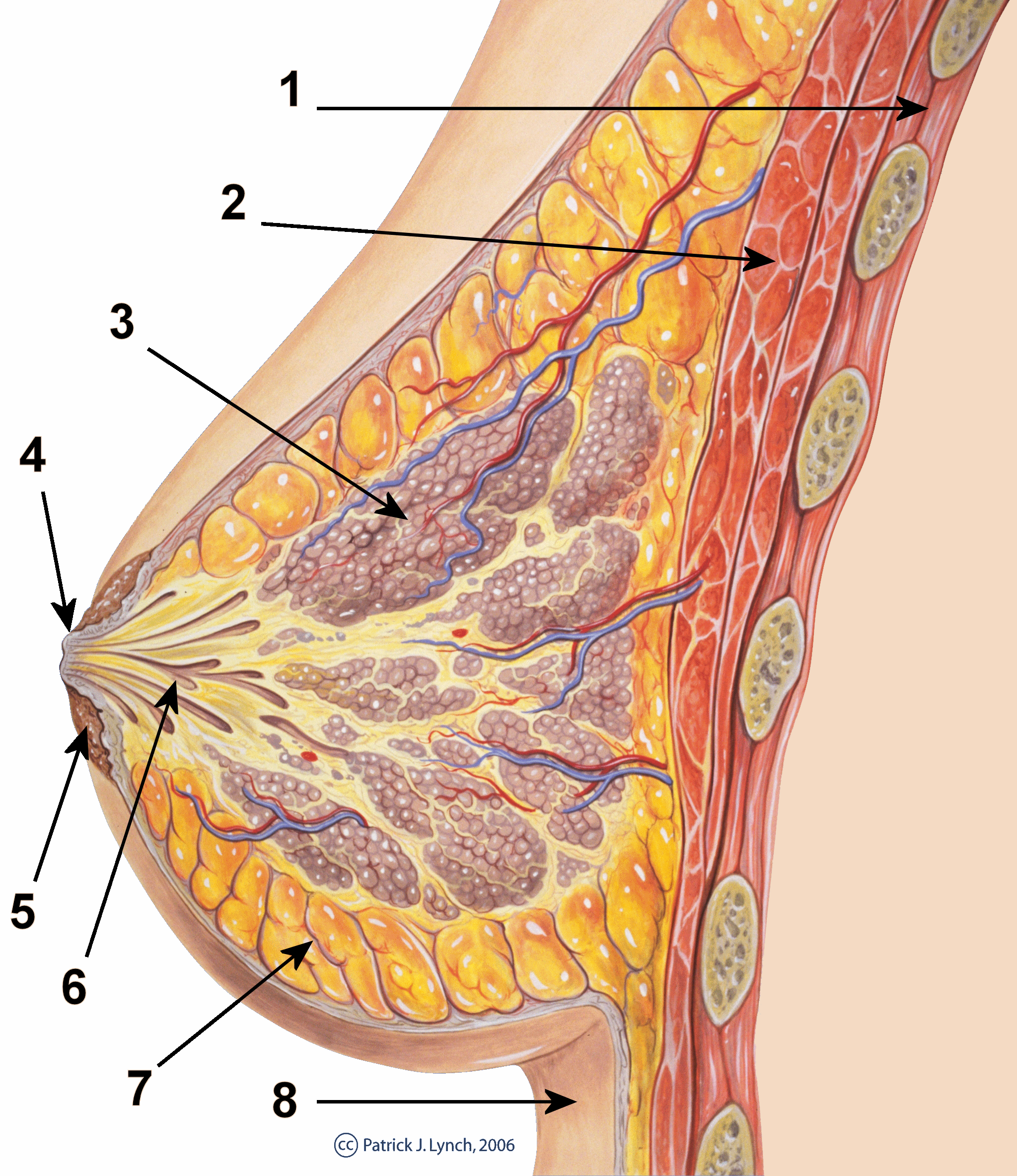
- Cross-section of the human mammary gland: 1. Chest wall 2. Pectoralis muscles 3. Lobules; 4. Nipple; 5. Areola; 6. Milk duct 7. Fatty tissue 8. Skin

Details
- Precursor: Mesoderm (blood vessels and connective tissue); Ectoderm (cellular elements)
- Artery: Internal thoracic artery Lateral thoracic artery
- Vein: Internal thoracic vein Axillary vein
- Nerve: Supraclavicular nerves Intercostal nerves (lateral and medial branches)
- Lymph: Pectoral axillary lymph nodes

Identifiers
- TA98: A16.0.02.006
- TA2: 7099
- FMA: 60088

A mammary gland is an exocrine gland that produces milk in mammals, including humans. Mammals get their name from the Latin word mamma, "breast". The mammary glands are arranged in organs such as the breasts in primates (for example, humans and chimpanzees), the udder in ruminants (for example, cows, goats, sheep, and deer), and the dugs of other animals (for example, dogs, cats, rabbits and pigs) to feed young offspring. Lactorrhea, the occasional production of milk by the glands, can occur in any mammal, but in most mammals, lactation, the production of enough milk for nursing, occurs only in phenotypic females who have gestated in recent months or years. It is directed by hormonal guidance from sex steroids. In a few mammalian species, male lactation can occur. With humans, male lactation can occur only under specific circumstances.

Mammals are divided into 3 groups: monotremes, metatherians, and eutherians. In the case of monotremes, their mammary glands are modified sebaceous glands and without nipples. Concerning most metatherians and eutherians, only females have functional mammary glands, with the exception of some bat species. Their mammary glands can be termed as breasts or udders. In the case of breasts, each mammary gland has its own nipple (e.g., human mammary glands). In the case of udders, pairs of mammary glands comprise a single mass, with more than one nipple (or teat) hanging from it. For instance, cows and buffalo udders have two pairs of mammary glands and four teats, whereas sheep and goat udders have one pair of mammary glands with two teats protruding from the udder. Each mammary gland produces milk for a single teat and is evolutionarily derived from modified sweat glands.

== Structure ==
The basic components of a mature mammary gland are the alveoli (hollow cavities, a few millimeters large), which are lined with milk-secreting cuboidal cells and surrounded by myoepithelial cells. These alveoli join to form groups known as lobules. Each lobule has a lactiferous duct that drains into openings in the nipple. The myoepithelial cells contract under the stimulation of oxytocin, excreting the milk secreted by alveolar units into the lobule lumen toward the nipple. As the infant begins to suck, the oxytocin-mediated "let down reflex" ensues, and the mother's milk is secreted—not sucked—from the gland into the infant's mouth.

All the milk-secreting tissue leading to a single lactiferous duct is collectively called a "simple mammary gland"; in a "complex mammary gland", all the simple mammary glands serve one nipple. Humans normally have two complex mammary glands, one in each breast, and each complex mammary gland consists of 10–20 simple glands. The opening of each simple gland on the surface of the nipple is called a "pore." The presence of more than two nipples is known as polythelia and the presence of more than two complex mammary glands as polymastia.

Maintaining the correct polarized morphology of the lactiferous duct tree requires another essential component – mammary epithelial cells extracellular matrix (ECM) which, together with adipocytes, fibroblast, inflammatory cells, and others, constitute mammary stroma. Mammary epithelial ECM mainly contains myoepithelial basement membrane and the connective tissue. They not only help to support mammary basic structure, but also serve as a communicating bridge between mammary epithelia and their local and global environment throughout this organ's development.

=== Histology ===
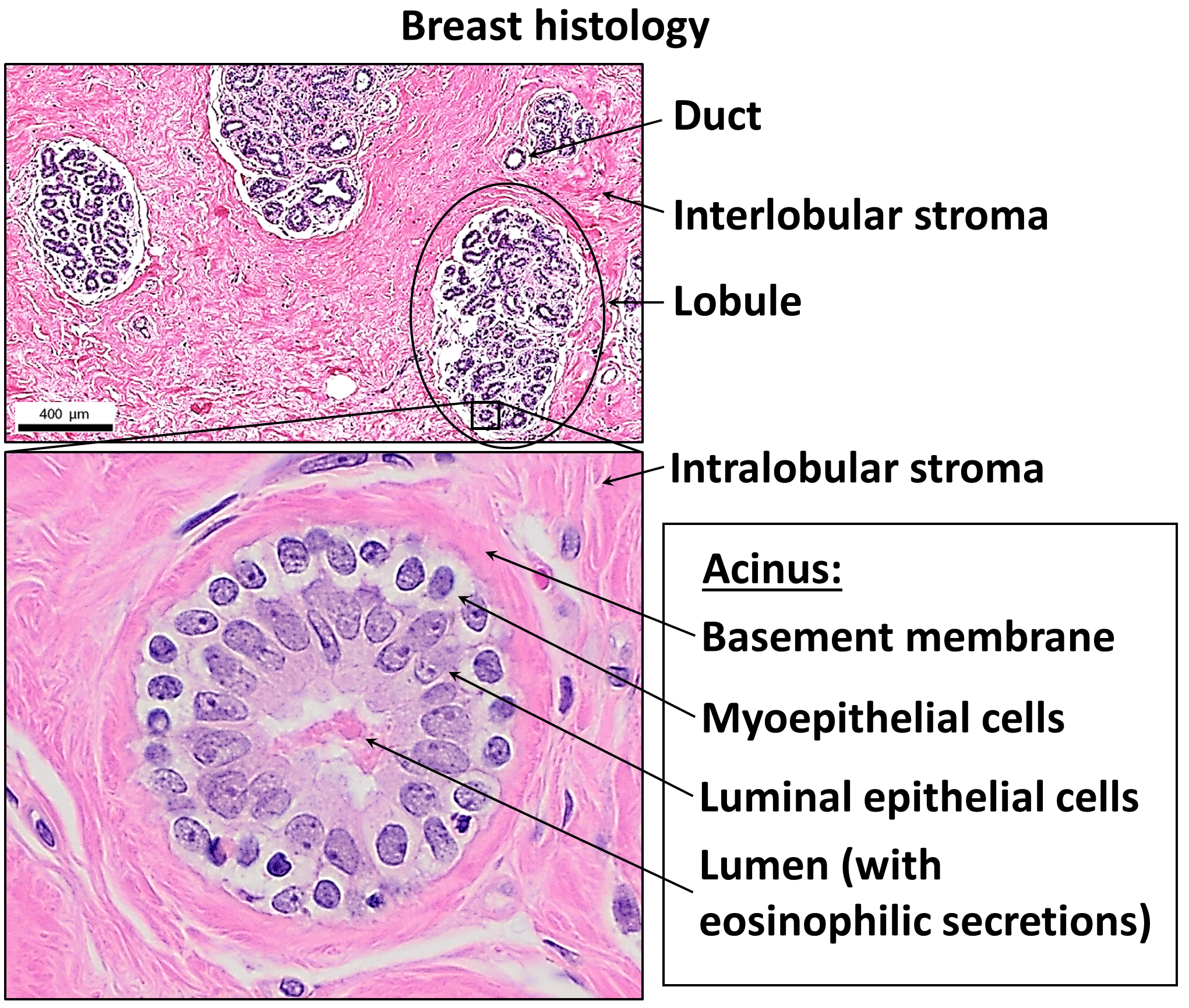
Normal histology of the breast

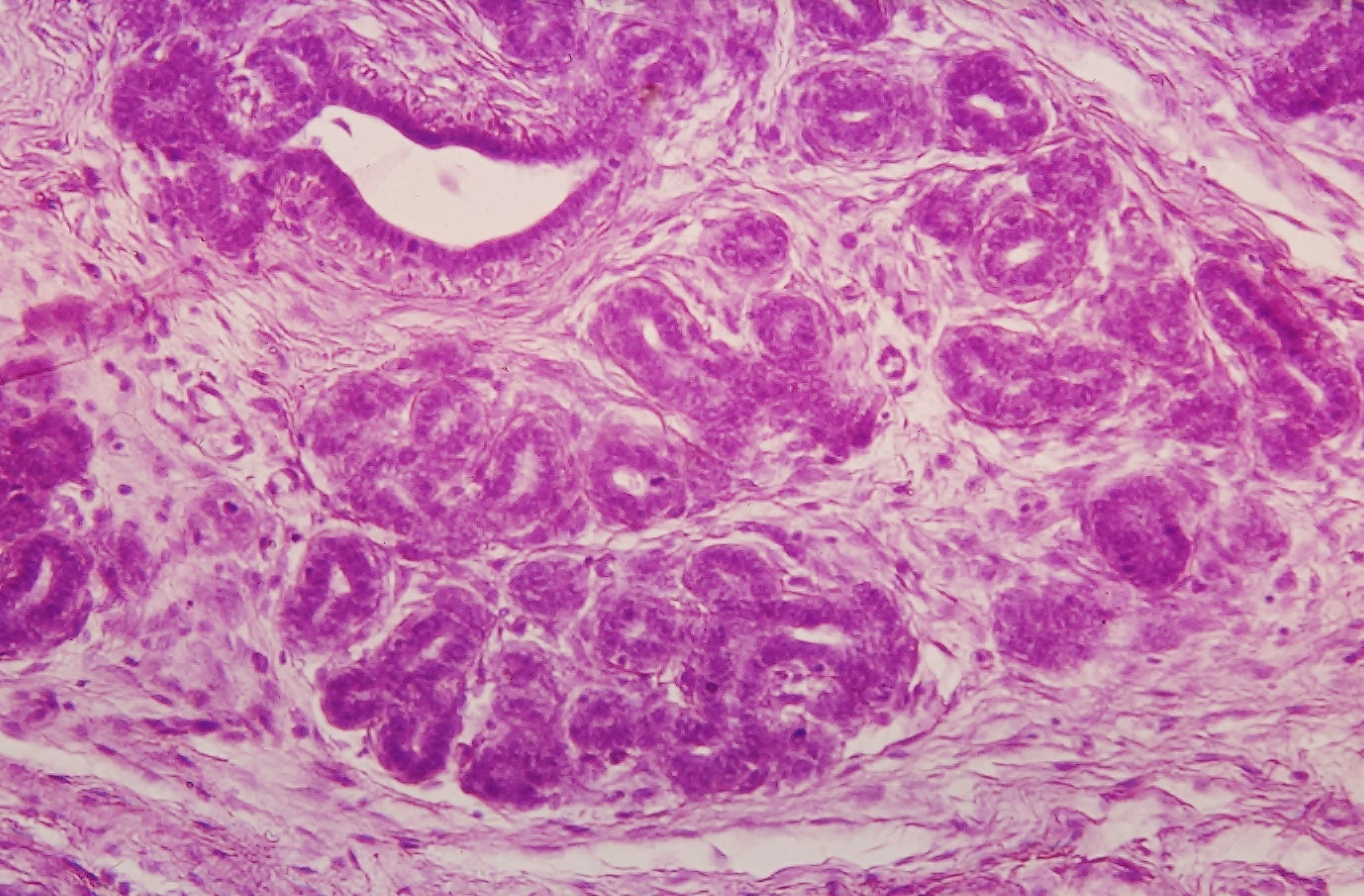
Light micrograph of a human proliferating mammary gland during estrous cycle. Sprouting gland tissue can be seen in the upper left field (haematoxylin eosin staining).

A mammary gland is a specific type of apocrine gland specialized for manufacture of colostrum (first milk) when giving birth. Mammary glands can be identified as apocrine because they exhibit striking "decapitation" secretion. Many sources assert that mammary glands are modified sweat glands.

== Development ==
Mammary glands develop during different growth cycles. They exist in both sexes during the embryonic stage, forming only a rudimentary duct tree at birth. In this stage, mammary gland development depends on systemic (and maternal) hormones, but is also under the (local) regulation of paracrine communication between neighboring epithelial and mesenchymal cells by parathyroid hormone-related protein (PTHrP). This locally secreted factor gives rise to a series of outside-in and inside-out positive feedback between these two types of cells, so that mammary bud epithelial cells can proliferate and sprout down into the mesenchymal layer until they reach the fat pad to begin the first round of branching. At the same time, the embryonic mesenchymal cells around the epithelial bud receive secreting factors activated by PTHrP, such as BMP4. These mesenchymal cells can transform into a dense, mammary-specific mesenchyme, which later develop into connective tissue with fibrous threads, forming blood vessels and the lymph system. A basement membrane, mainly containing laminin and collagen, formed afterward by differentiated myoepithelial cells, keeps the polarity of this primary duct tree. These components of the extracellular matrix are strong determinants of duct morphogenesis.

=== Biochemistry ===
Estrogen and growth hormone (GH) are essential for the ductal component of mammary gland development, and act synergistically to mediate it. Neither estrogen nor GH are capable of inducing ductal development without the other. The role of GH in ductal development has been found to be mostly mediated by its induction of the secretion of insulin-like growth factor 1 (IGF-1), which occurs both systemically (mainly originating from the liver) and locally in the mammary fat pad through activation of the growth hormone receptor (GHR). However, GH itself also acts independently of IGF-1 to stimulate ductal development by upregulating estrogen receptor (ER) expression in mammary gland tissue, which is a downstream effect of mammary gland GHR activation. In any case, unlike IGF-1, GH itself is not essential for mammary gland development, and IGF-1 in conjunction with estrogen can induce normal mammary gland development without the presence of GH. In addition to IGF-1, other paracrine growth factors such as epidermal growth factor (EGF), transforming growth factor beta (TGF-β), amphiregulin, fibroblast growth factor (FGF), and hepatocyte growth factor (HGF) are involved in breast development as mediators downstream to sex hormones and GH/IGF-1.

During embryonic development, IGF-1 levels are low, and gradually increase from birth to puberty. At puberty, the levels of GH and IGF-1 reach their highest levels in life and estrogen begins to be secreted in high amounts in females, which is when ductal development mostly takes place. Under the influence of estrogen, stromal and fat tissue surrounding the ductal system in the mammary glands also grows. After puberty, GH and IGF-1 levels progressively decrease, which limits further development until pregnancy, if it occurs. During pregnancy, progesterone and prolactin are essential for mediating lobuloalveolar development in estrogen-primed mammary gland tissue, which occurs in preparation of lactation and nursing.

Androgens such as testosterone inhibit estrogen-mediated mammary gland development (e.g., by reducing local ER expression) through activation of androgen receptors expressed in mammary gland tissue, and in conjunction with relatively low estrogen levels, are the cause of the lack of developed mammary glands in males.

=== Timeline ===
==== Before birth ====
Mammary gland development is characterized by the unique process by which the epithelium invades the stroma. The development of the mammary gland occurs mainly after birth. During puberty, tubule formation is coupled with branching morphogenesis which establishes the basic arboreal network of ducts emanating from the nipple.

Developmentally, mammary gland epithelium is constantly produced and maintained by rare epithelial cells, dubbed as mammary progenitors which are ultimately thought to be derived from tissue-resident stem cells.

Embryonic mammary gland development can be divided into a series of specific stages. Initially, the formation of the milk lines that run between the fore and hind limbs bilaterally on each side of the midline occurs around embryonic day 10.5 (E10.5). The second stage occurs at E11.5 when placode formation begins along the mammary milk line. This will eventually give rise to the nipple. Lastly, the third stage occurs at E12.5 and involves the invagination of cells within the placode into the mesenchyme, leading to a mammary anlage (biology).

The primitive (stem) cells are detected in the embryo and their numbers increase steadily during development.

==== Growth ====
Postnatally, the mammary ducts elongate into the mammary fat pad. Then, starting around four weeks of age, mammary ductal growth increases significantly with the ducts invading towards the lymph node. Terminal end buds, the highly proliferative structures found at the tips of the invading ducts, expand and increase greatly during this stage. This developmental period is characterized by the emergence of the terminal end buds and lasts until an age of about 7–8 weeks.

By the pubertal stage, the mammary ducts have invaded to the end of the mammary fat pad. At this point, the terminal end buds become less proliferative and decrease in size. Side branches form from the primary ducts and begin to fill the mammary fat pad. Ductal development decreases with the arrival of sexual maturity and undergoes estrous cycles (proestrus, estrus, metestrus, and diestrus). As a result of estrous cycling, the mammary gland undergoes dynamic changes where cells proliferate and then regress in an ordered fashion.

==== Pregnancy ====
During pregnancy, the ductal systems undergo rapid proliferation and form alveolar structures within the branches to be used for milk production. After delivery, lactation occurs within the mammary gland; lactation involves the secretion of milk by the luminal cells in the alveoli. Contraction of the myoepithelial cells surrounding the alveoli will cause the milk to be ejected through the ducts and into the nipple for the nursing infant. Upon weaning of the infant, lactation stops and the mammary gland turns in on itself, a process called involution. This process involves the controlled collapse of mammary epithelial cells where cells begin apoptosis in a controlled manner, reverting the mammary gland back to a pubertal state.

==== Postmenopausal ====
During postmenopause, due to much lower levels of estrogen, and due to lower levels of GH and IGF-1, which decrease with age, mammary gland tissue atrophies and the mammary glands become smaller.

== Physiology ==
=== Hormonal control ===
Lactiferous duct development occurs in females in response to circulating hormones. First development is frequently seen during pre- and postnatal stages, and later during puberty. Estrogen promotes branching differentiation, whereas in males testosterone inhibits it. A mature duct tree reaching the limit of the fat pad of the mammary gland comes into being by bifurcation of duct terminal end buds (TEB), secondary branches sprouting from primary ducts and proper duct lumen formation. These processes are tightly modulated by components of mammary epithelial ECM interacting with systemic hormones and local secreting factors. However, for each mechanism the epithelial cells' "niche" can be delicately unique with different membrane receptor profiles and basement membrane thickness from specific branching area to area, so as to regulate cell growth or differentiation sub-locally. Important players include beta-1 integrin, epidermal growth factor receptor (EGFR), laminin-1/5, collagen-IV, matrix metalloproteinase (MMPs), heparan sulfate proteoglycans, and others. Elevated circulating level of growth hormone and estrogen get to multipotent cap cells on TEB tips through a thin, leaky layer of basement membrane. These hormones promote specific gene expression. Hence cap cells can differentiate into myoepithelial and luminal (duct) epithelial cells, and the increased amount of activated MMPs can degrade surrounding ECM helping duct buds to reach further in the fat pads. On the other hand, basement membrane along the mature mammary ducts is thicker, with strong adhesion to epithelial cells via binding to integrin and non-integrin receptors. When side branches develop, it is a much more "pushing-forward" working process including extending through myoepithelial cells, degrading basement membrane and then invading into a periductal layer of fibrous stromal tissue. Degraded basement membrane fragments (laminin-5) roles to lead the way of mammary epithelial cells migration. Whereas, laminin-1 interacts with non-integrin receptor dystroglycan negatively regulates this side branching process in case of cancer. These complex "Yin-yang" balancing crosstalks between mammary ECM and epithelial cells "instruct" healthy mammary gland development until adult.

There is preliminary evidence that soybean intake mildly stimulates the breast glands in pre- and postmenopausal women.

=== Pregnancy ===
Secretory alveoli develop mainly in pregnancy, when rising levels of prolactin, estrogen, and progesterone cause further branching, together with an increase in adipose tissue and a richer blood flow. In gestation, serum progesterone remains at a stably high concentration so signaling through its receptor is continuously activated. As one of the transcribed genes, Wnts secreted from mammary epithelial cells act paracrinely to induce more neighboring cells' branching. When the lactiferous duct tree is almost ready, "leaves" alveoli are differentiated from luminal epithelial cells and added at the end of each branch. In late pregnancy and for the first few days after giving birth, colostrum is secreted. Milk secretion (lactation) begins a few days later due to reduction in circulating progesterone and the presence of another important hormone prolactin, which mediates further alveologenesis, milk protein production, and regulates osmotic balance and tight junction function. Laminin and collagen in myoepithelial basement membrane interacting with beta-1 integrin on epithelial surface again, is essential in this process. Their binding ensures correct placement of prolactin receptors on the basal lateral side of alveoli cells and directional secretion of milk into lactiferous ducts. Suckling of the baby causes release of the hormone oxytocin, which stimulates contraction of the myoepithelial cells. In this combined control from ECM and systemic hormones, milk secretion can be reciprocally amplified so as to provide enough nutrition for the baby.

=== Weaning ===
During weaning, decreased prolactin, missing mechanical stimulation (baby suckling), and changes in osmotic balance caused by milk stasis and leaking of tight junctions cause cessation of milk production. It is the (passive) process of a child or animal ceasing to be dependent on the mother for nourishment. In some species there is complete or partial involution of alveolar structures after weaning, in humans there is only partial involution and the level of involution in humans appears to be highly individual. The glands in the breast do secrete fluid also in nonlactating women. In some other species (such as cows), all alveoli and secretory duct structures collapse by programmed cell death (apoptosis) and autophagy for lack of growth promoting factors either from the ECM or circulating hormones. At the same time, apoptosis of blood capillary endothelial cells speeds up the regression of lactation ductal beds. Shrinkage of the mammary duct tree and ECM remodeling by various proteinase is under the control of somatostatin and other growth inhibiting hormones and local factors. This major structural change leads loose fat tissue to fill the empty space afterward. But a functional lactiferous duct tree can be formed again when a female is pregnant again.

== Clinical significance ==
Tumorigenesis in mammary glands can be induced biochemically by abnormal expression level of circulating hormones or local ECM components, or from a mechanical change in the tension of mammary stroma. Under either of the two circumstances, mammary epithelial cells would grow out of control and eventually result in cancer. Almost all instances of breast cancer originate in the lobules or ducts of the mammary glands.

== Other mammals ==
=== General ===
The breasts of female humans vary from most other mammals that tend to have less conspicuous mammary glands. The number and positioning of mammary glands varies widely in different mammals. The protruding teats and accompanying glands can be located anywhere along the two milk lines. In general most mammals develop mammary glands in pairs along these lines, with a number approximating the number of young typically birthed at a time. The number of teats varies from 2 (in most primates) to 18 (in pigs). The Virginia opossum has 13, one of the few mammals with an odd number. The following table lists the number and position of teats and glands found in a range of mammals:

Species	Anterior (thoracic)	Intermediate (abdominal)	Posterior (inguinal)	Total
Goat, sheep, horse guinea pig	0	0	2	2
Cattle	0	0	4	4
Cat	2	2	4	8
Dog	4	2	2 or 4	8 or 10
Mouse	6	0	4	10
Rat	6	2	4	12
Pig	6	6	6	18
Proboscideans, primates	2	0	0	2
Virginia opossum	0	0	13	13
Southern red-sided opossum	0	0	25 to 27	25 to 27

Male mammals typically have rudimentary mammary glands and nipples, with a few exceptions: male mice do not have nipples, male marsupials do not have mammary glands, and male horses lack nipples. The male dayak fruit bat has lactating mammary glands. Male lactation occurs infrequently in some species.

Mammary glands are true protein factories, and several labs have constructed transgenic animals, mainly goats and cows, to produce proteins for pharmaceutical use. Complex glycoproteins such as monoclonal antibodies or antithrombin cannot be produced by genetically engineered bacteria, and the production in live mammals is much cheaper than the use of mammalian cell cultures.

=== Evolution ===
There are many theories on how mammary glands evolved. For example, it is thought that the mammary gland is a transformed sweat gland, more closely related to apocrine sweat glands. Because mammary glands do not fossilize well, supporting such theories with fossil evidence is difficult. Many of the current theories are based on comparisons between lines of living mammals—monotremes, marsupials, and eutherians. One theory proposes that mammary glands evolved from glands that were used to keep the eggs of early mammals moist and free from infection (monotremes still lay eggs). Other theories suggest that early secretions were used directly by hatched young, or that the secretions were used by young to help them orient to their mothers.

Lactation is thought to have developed long before the evolution of the mammary gland and mammals; see evolution of lactation.

== Additional images ==
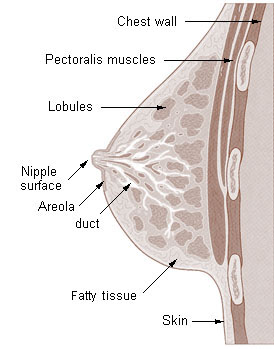
Cross section of the breast of a human female

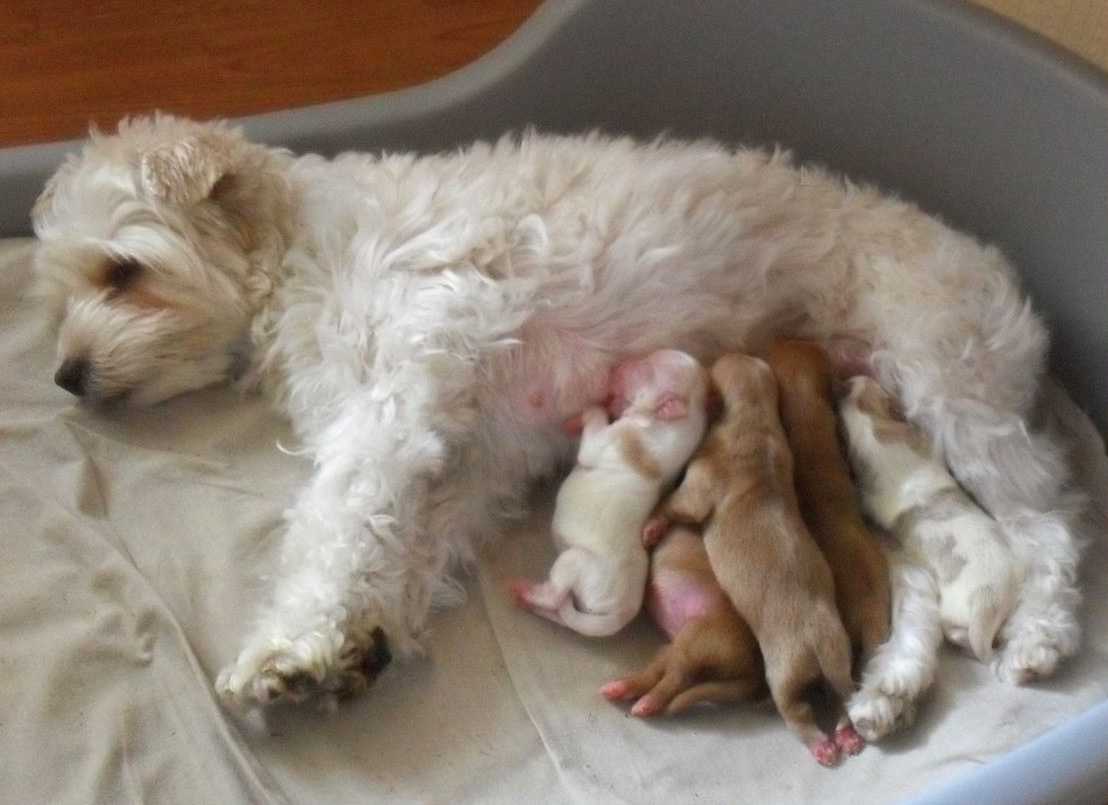
Dog

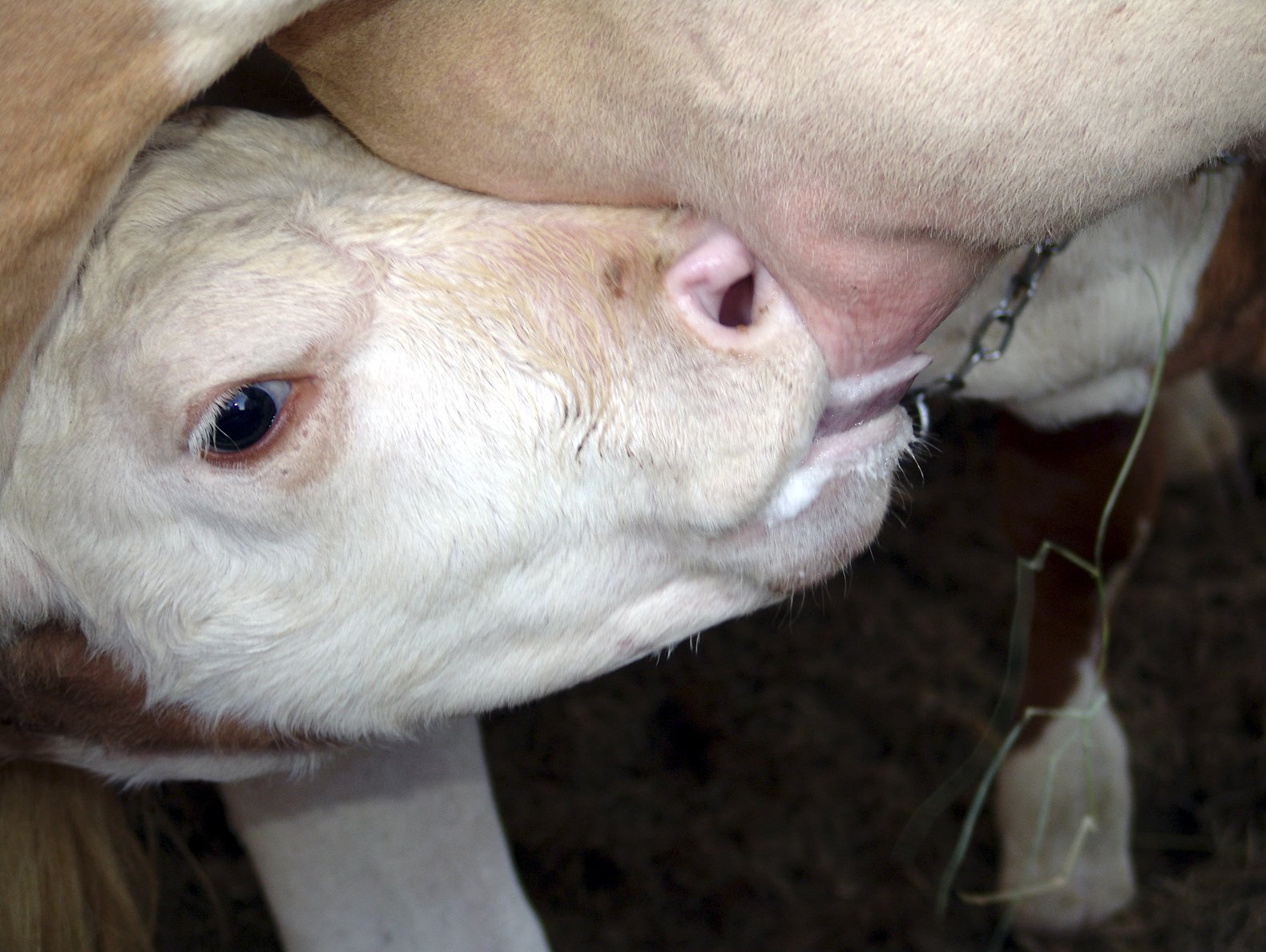
Cow

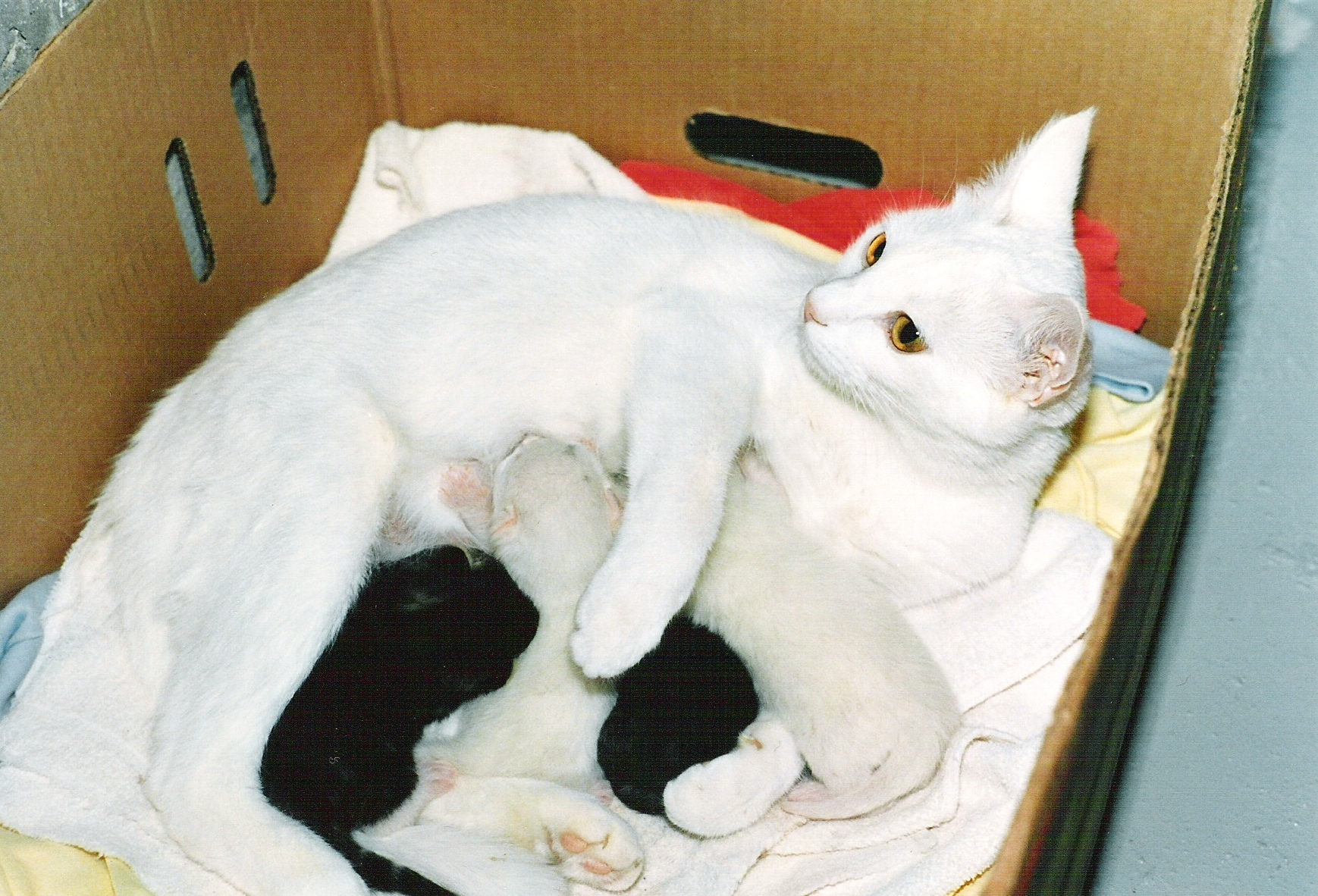
Cat

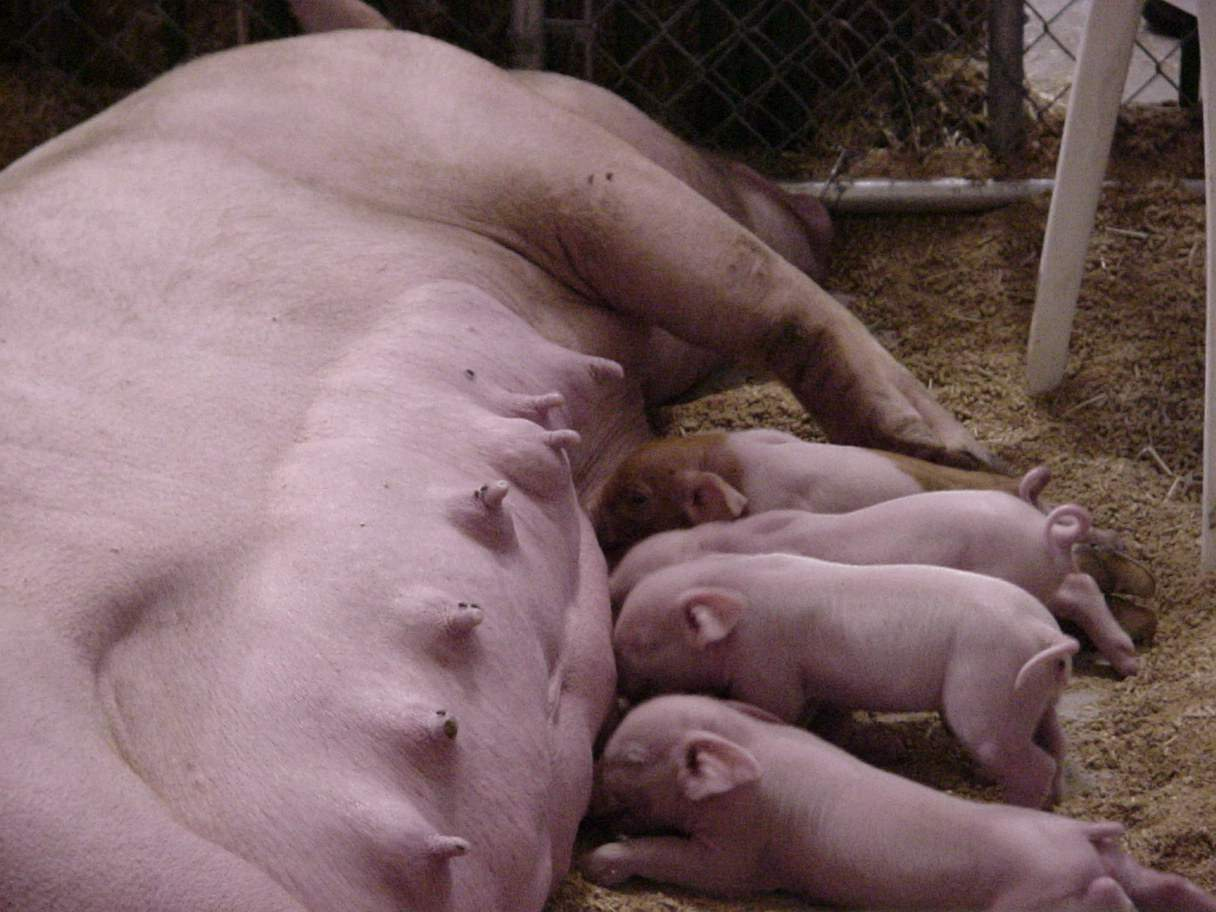
Pig

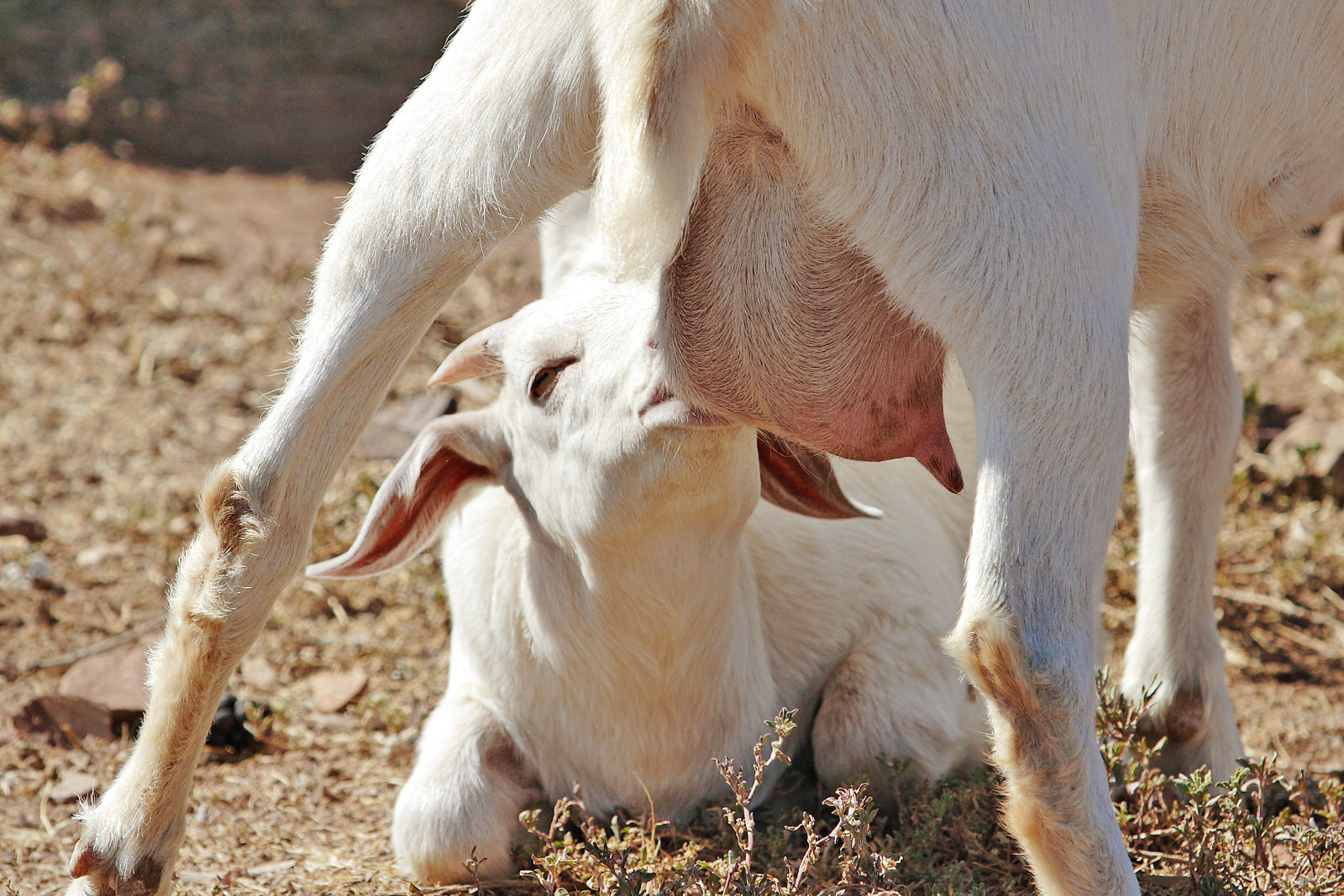
Goat

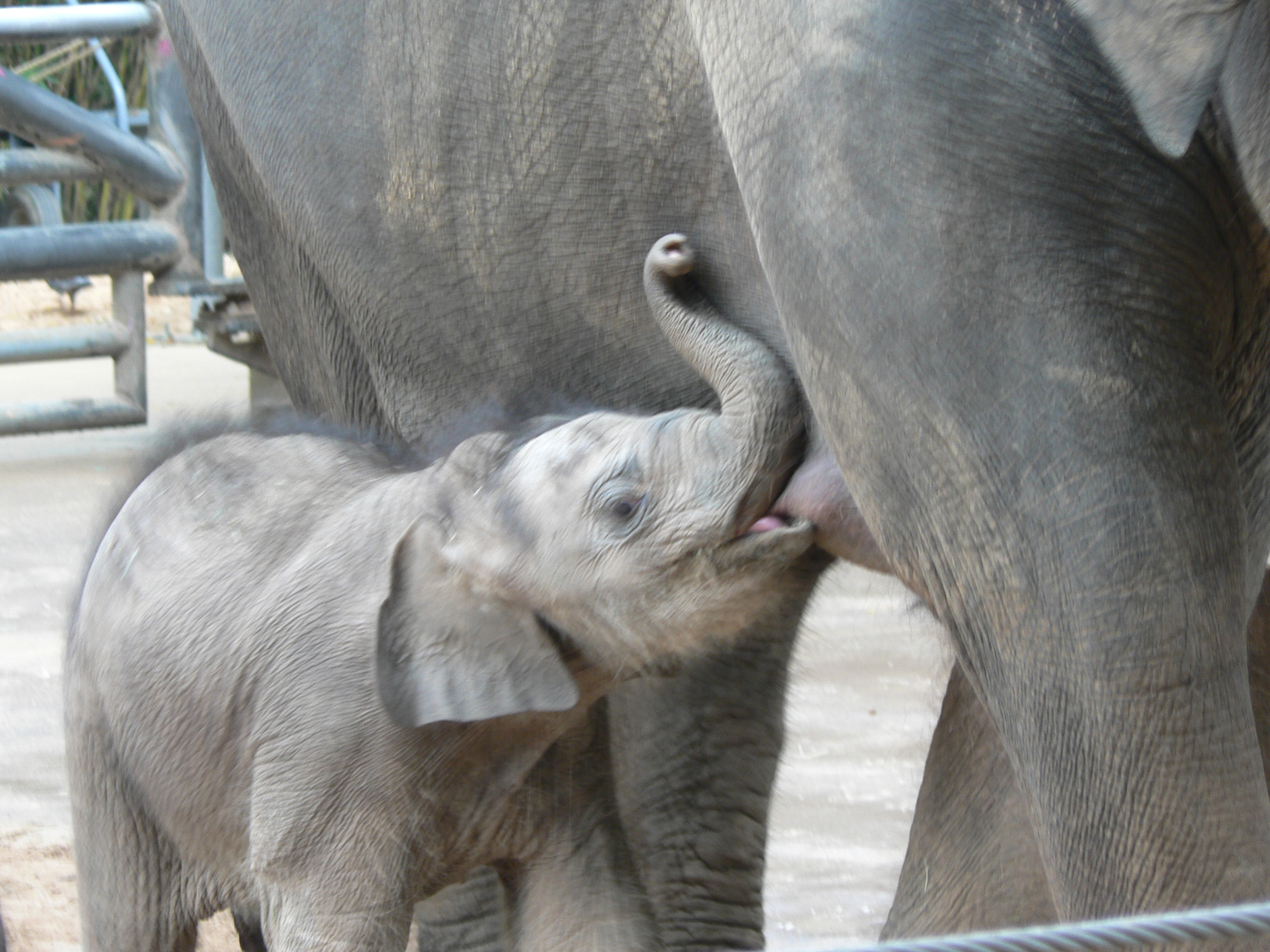
Elephant

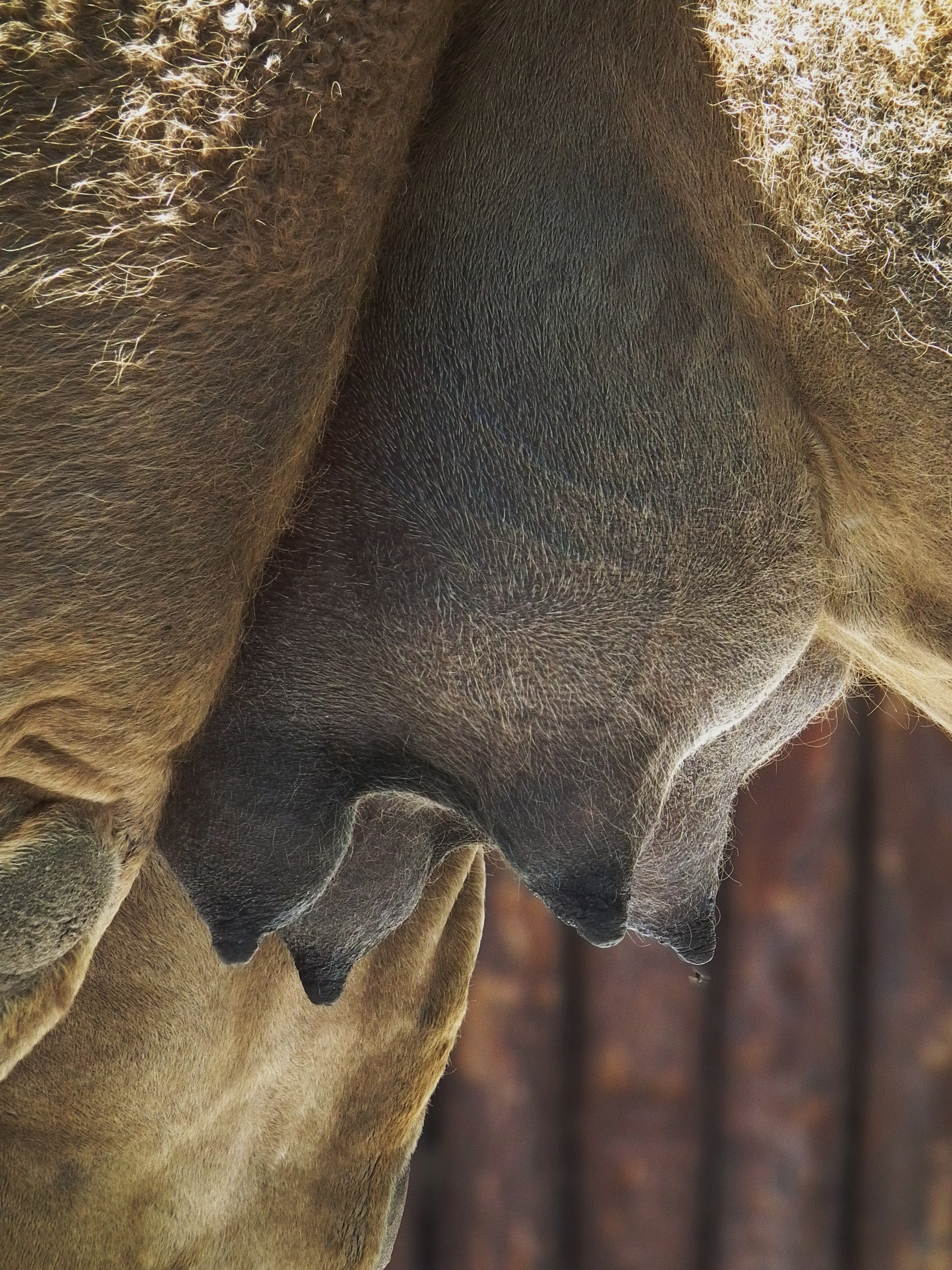
Dromedary camel

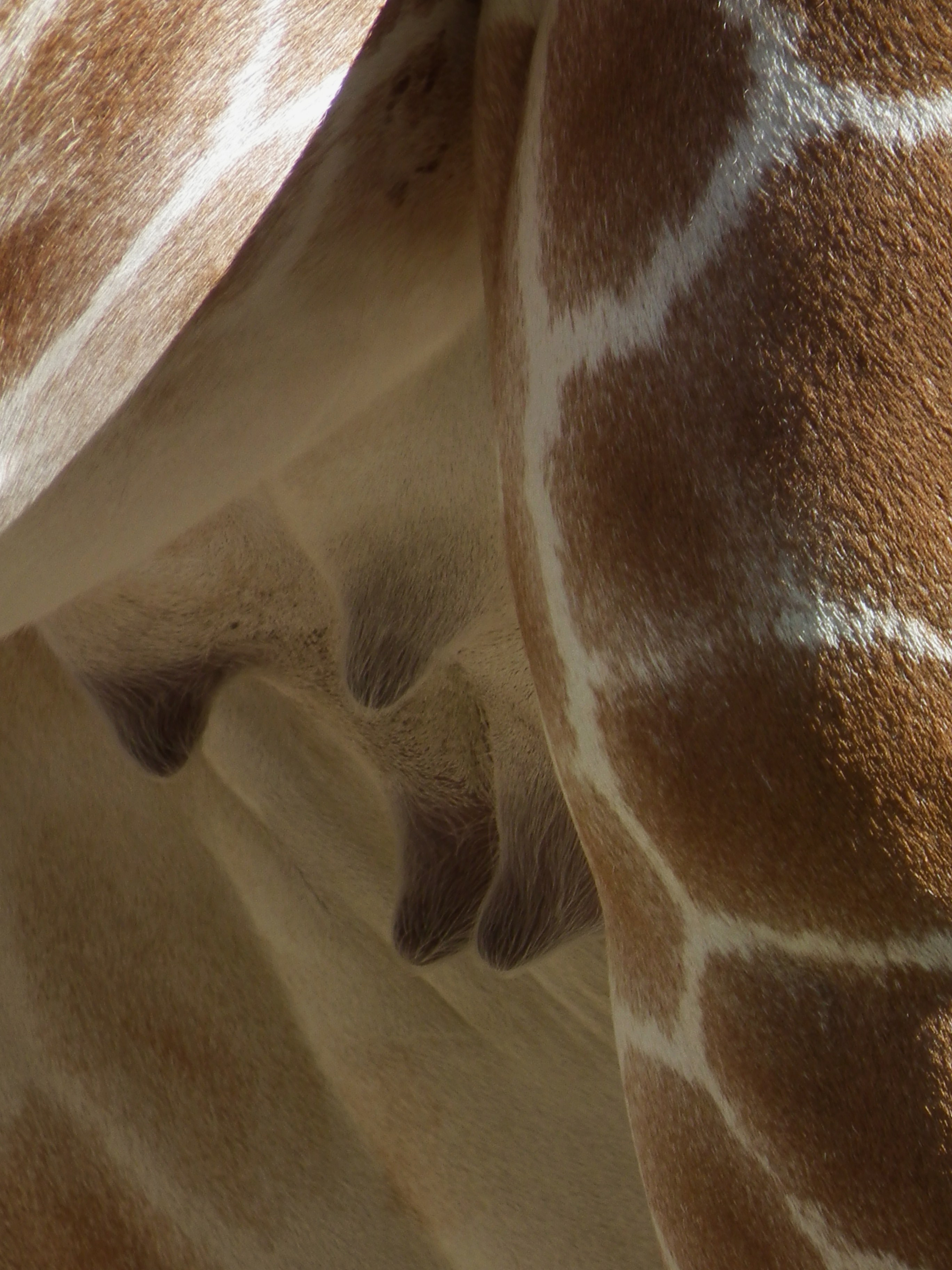
Giraffe

== See also ==
- Breastfeeding
- Mammary tumor
- Mammaglobin
- Gynecomastia
- Hypothalamic–pituitary–prolactin axis
- Udder
- Witch's milk
- Milk line
- List of glands of the human body#Skin

List of distinct cell types in the adult human body

== Bibliography ==
- Ackerman, A. Bernard; Almut Böer; Bruce Bennin; Geoffrey J. Gottlieb (2005). Histologic Diagnosis of Inflammatory Skin Diseases An Algorithmic Method Based on Pattern Analysis. Ardor Scribendi. ISBN 978-1-893357-25-9. Archived from the original on 21 April 2011.
- Moore, Keith L. et al. (2010) Clinically Oriented Anatomy 6th Ed
