= Polymastia =

Polymastia may refer to:

- Accessory breasts
- Polymastia (sponge), a genus of sponge
