= Snub (disambiguation) =

A snub is a refusal to recognise an acquaintance. It may also refer to:

- Snub (geometry), an operation applied to a polyhedron
- Lawrence Snub Mosley (1905–1981), American jazz trombonist
- Snub Pollard, stage name of Australian-born silent film comedian Harry Fraser (1889–1962)
- Snub TV
- SNUB, a non-profit organisation aimed at stopping the urban sprawl of Norwich, UK
- Supernumerary nipples–uropathies–Becker's nevus syndrome or SNUB syndrome, a medical condition
- snub, a nautical term, meaning to suddenly stop a rope that is running out

== See also ==
- Snubber, a fluidic, mechanical or electrical device used to suppress transients
- Snubbing, a type of heavy well intervention performed on oil and gas wells
