= Teat =

Projection from mammary glands from which milk flows

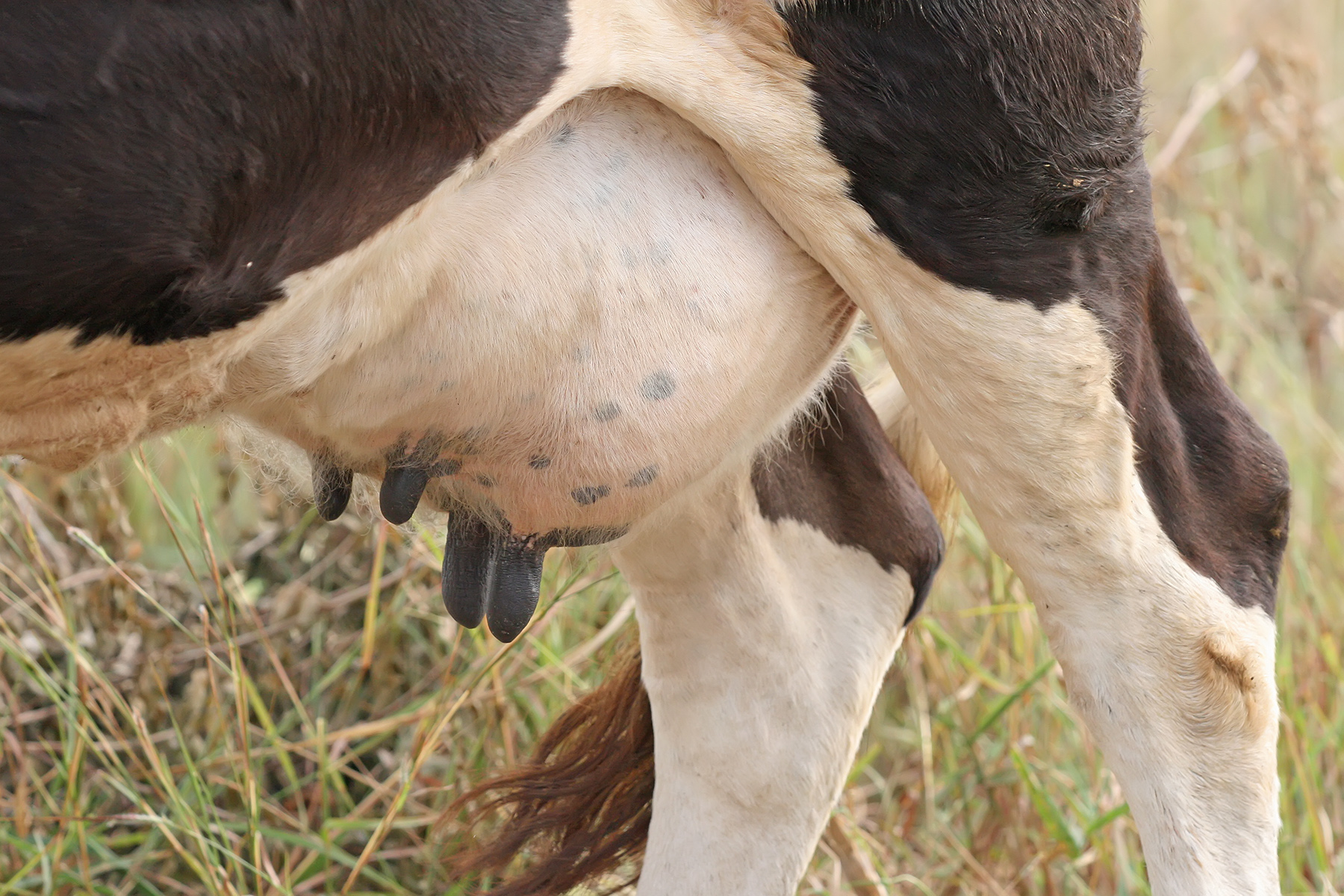
Teats protruding from the udder of a cow

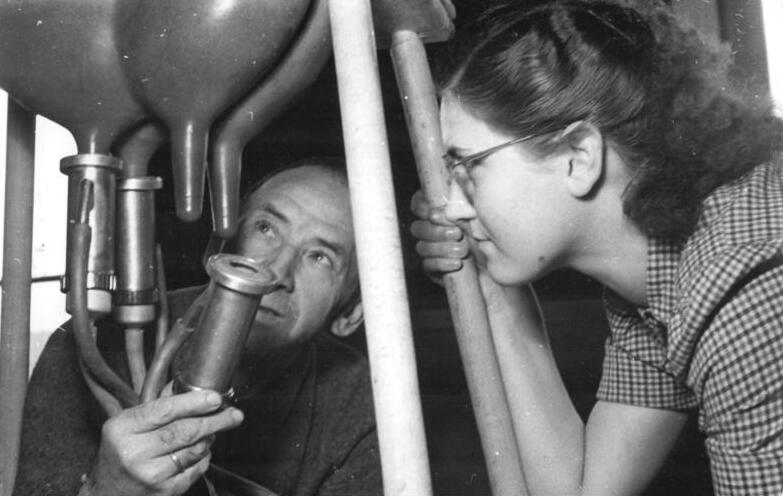
Part of a milking device that fits over the teats of a cow.

A teat is the projection from the mammary glands of mammals from which milk flows or is ejected for the purpose of feeding young. In many mammals, the teat projects from the udder. The number of teats varies by mammalian species and often corresponds to the average litter size for that animal. In some cases, the teats of female animals are milked for the purpose of human consumption.

The quality of some domesticated animals is determined by the establishment of desired characteristics, such as teat size and placement.

== Number and positioning in other animals ==
The number and positioning of mammary glands and teats varies widely among mammals. The protruding teats and accompanying glands can be located anywhere along the two milk lines. In general, most mammals develop mammary glands in pairs along these lines, with a number approximating the number of young typically birthed at a time. The number of teats varies from 2 (in elephants and anthropoids) to 18 (in pigs). Marsupials usually have 4 to 12 teats, but the Virginia opossum has 13, one of the few mammals with an odd number. The following table lists the number and position of teats and glands found in a range of mammals:

Species	Cranial teats (thoracic)	Intermediate teats (abdominal)	Caudal teats (inguinal)	Total teats
Goat, sheep, horse guinea pig	0	0	2	2
Polar bear	4	0	0	4
American black bear, Asian black bear, grizzly bear	4	0	2	6
Camel	0	0	4	4
Cattle	0	0	4	4
Cat	2	2	4	8
Dog	4	2	2 or 4	8 or 10
Mouse	6	0	4	10
Rat	6	2	4	12
Pig	4	4	4	12
Elephants, Anteaters, anthropoids (including humans)	2	0	0	2

== Disease of teats ==
A number of diseases can affect the teats of cattle.

- Pseudocowpox
- Warts caused by bovine papillomavirus
- Teat-end hyperkeratosis
- Dermatitis
- Frostbite
- Udder sores or necrotic dermatitis

Goats are also affected by diseases of the teats.

== Etymology ==
Teat is derived from the Old French or Dutch word, "tete" or the Greek word τιτθύς. An alternative, but possibly not unrelated, would be the Welsh word "teth" or the Old English, "titt" which is still used as a slang term. The words "teat" and "tit" share a Germanic ancestor. The second of the two, tit, was inherited directly from Proto-Germanic, while the first entered English via Old French.

== See also ==
- Nipple
