= First Cut (TV series) =

British television series

First Cut was initially a strand of thirty half-hour primetime documentaries commissioned by Channel 4. The commissioning editor for documentaries was Sarah Mulvey. It was added to the schedule to replace Alt-TV, which launched the careers of documentary makers including Marc Isaacs, Olly Lambert, Emily James, Tina Gharavi, Paul Berczeller and Morgan Matthew. First Cut aimed to showcase new talent, allowing young directors to demonstrate their work before receiving further opportunities on Channel 4's flagship documentaries Cutting Edge and Dispatches. After the completion of the initial two series (30 episodes), First Cut was commissioned for a third series which began on Friday, 9 January 2009, with a documentary entitled "The Hunt For Britain's Tightest Person".

== Series 1 (2007-2008) ==
| No. | Title | Directed by | Produced by | Original release date | Prod. code |
|---|---|---|---|---|---|
| 1 | "In Search of Mr Average" | Tim Wardle | Century Films | 23 November 2007 | 101 |
The series begins with a film about a documentary-maker's search for the most average person in the UK. It's a neat excuse for painting some touching vignettes of ordinary Brits, their fears, their habits, their fashion sense. It turns out that the most average part of Britain is Colchester and the average Briton gets three pieces of junk mail every day. We also learn that to be average often means contentment: reaching after specialness or fame, it turns out, is no way to find happiness.
| 2 | "Sleep With Me" | Pat O'Mahony | October Films | 29 November 2007 | 102 |
A look at the bed-sharing politics of couples all over the UK, Sleep with Me blends anecdotal interview with stills photography as it journeys into the hidden world of the bedroom. Eight couples open their bedroom doors: young and old, straight and gay, married and unmarried, with and without children.
| 3 | "Karaoke Soul" | Joshua Neale | Raw Television | 30 November 2007 | 103 |
Set in and around a northern town, Karaoke Soul follows three people who find relief from their everyday lives through song. Director Joshua Neale mixes stylised musical performances with intimate observational documentary to tell the very personal stories of three people through the songs that are close to their hearts.
| 4 | "Cyber-Skiving" | Tim Wright | Eleven Films | 6 December 2007 | 104 |
A spoof documentary following a day in the life of an office worker's desktop. Already under pressure from her boss to deliver an overdue spreadsheet, Lucy distracts herself by surfing the web. But her day takes an unfortunate turn when she discovers she was unwittingly filmed - and now the embarrassing video is on YouTube.
| 5 | "The Rules of Seduction" | John Farrar | Talkback Thames | 7 December 2007 | 105 |
A journey into the hidden world of the pick-up artist or "pua", a community of men who've developed a sequence of tricks, codes and routines that they claim any man can use to seduce any woman. The programme follows the lives of three would-be Lotharios who have been drawn into this underground network.
| 6 | "Happy Birthday, You're Dead!" | Maja Borg | Teebster | 13 December 2007 | 106 |
With just four weeks left until she turns 25, filmmaker Maja Borg attempts to trace the Romanian fortune teller who claimed she would die before reaching the quarter-century mark.
| 7 | "Being Maxine Carr" | Maxx Ginnanea | Renegade Pictures & Eleven Films | 14 December 2007 | 107 |
Documentary about the modern day witch-hunt for Maxine Carr, former girlfriend of Soham murderer Ian Huntley. Victims of a perceived need for vengeance, more than a dozen innocent women have been mistaken for Carr and hounded from their homes. Maxx Ginnane examines the surreally horrific events of their lives as the mob mentality took hold.
| 8 | "The Last Freak Show" | Simon Tatum | October Films | 20 December 2007 | 108 |
Following professional musician Jeffrey Marshall, who was born without arms or legs, as he decides to exhibit himself in America's only remaining freak show.
| 9 | "The Triple Nipple Club" | Dan Louw | V Good Films | 2 January 2008 | 109 |
Dan was born with two arms, two legs, two eyes, two ears... and four nipples. Now 28, he's determined to get to the bottom of why: what is it that causes one in eight of us, including Hollywood actress Tilda Swinton and singer Lily Allen, to have an extra nubbin or two? First Cut: The Triple Nipple Club is a funny and touching film that sees new director Dan Louw set out on a surprising personal journey into this genetic riddle.
| 10 | "The Great Football Giveaway" | Paul Clarke | Tape 13 LTD | 2 January 2008 | 110 |
A true story about Paul Clarke who gave up everything to give away footballs to children in Africa. What started as a mad idea turned into an epic story about setting up a charity and hand delivering over 6,000 footballs to children in Malawi, one of the world's poorest countries, and Angola, one of the world's most dangerous countries.
| 11 | "Murderers On The Dancefloor" | Sarah McCarthy | RDF Media | 3 January 2008 | 111 |
Murderers on the Dance Floor tells the story behind a YouTube clip that has now been viewed by over 9 million people. In this incredible clip 1,500 inmates of a Filipino prison dance to Michael Jackson's Thriller. But Thriller isn't the only dance the inmates perform; their dazzling repertoire includes Giorgio Moroder's Electric Dreams, a rock version of Canon in D major and numbers from Sister Act.
| 12 | "Johnny Congo" | Dave Tucker | Killing Ants Productions | 3 January 2008 | 112 |
The past is not the past until you stop reliving it. Seventy-one-year-old Johnny Murphy spent 40 years fighting as a mercenary in the African jungle, but his biggest battle is perhaps the one he's now fighting with boredom, in a Surrey retirement home.
| 13 | "A Piece of the Moon" | James Price & Lenka Clayton | Century Films | 4 January 2008 | 113 |
Have you ever looked up at the Moon and thought: 'I want to own a piece of that'? Thousands of Britons have. Cornish businessman Francis P. Williams has sold over 280,000 acres (1,100 km^{2}) of it in Britain, at around £20 a pop. But does Francis really own the moon? And why do so many people want to "own" a rock in the sky that they can't even get to? For First Cut, new directors James Price and Lenka Clayton travelled the country to tell the stories of some of the ordinary people who've bought land on the Moon and the businessman who's sold it to them.
| 14 | "Allergic to the 21st Century?" | Ann-Claire Pilley | IWC Glasgow | 4 January 2008 | 114 |
There are a growing number of people in Britain today who believe the century they're living in is making them sick. New director Anne-Claire Pilley travels around the country to meet some of them. In London, Sarah Dacre says she suffers such strong allergic responses to electrical appliances and mobile phones that she's moving out of the capital; in Somerset, Gillian McCarthy claims to have such extreme sensitivities to everything from household chemicals to electricity that she is allergic to her own hair.
| 15 | "Health Food Junkies" | Rowan Deacon | Maverick Television | 11 January 2008 | 115 |
Something strange is happening to our food: it's no longer simply something we eat, but an idol we're encouraged to worship. We're told that blueberries and broccoli will prolong our lives, and super foods will save our souls. First Cut: Health Food Junkies meets some devoted health food worshippers: a growing community of men and women who believe theirs is the healthiest diet on the planet.

== Series 2 (2008) ==
| No. | Title | Directed by | Produced by | Original release date | Prod. code |
|---|---|---|---|---|---|
| 16 | "Saving Britney Spears" | Bruce Fletcher | Raw Television | 1 August 2008 | 201 |
First Cut takes a road trip across the USA to meet the people who've made Britney's breakdown their business. Young filmmaker Bruce Fletcher flies to LA to film the people who are capitalising on the breakdown of Britney Spears, either to make money or become famous themselves. They include paparazzi, disturbed adolescents and creepy preachers.
| 17 | "Time Warp Wives" | Sally Hewitt | TBA | 8 August 2008 | 202 |
Having rejected the independence that comes with being a modern working woman, Joanne, Debbie, Diane and Sammi are desperate to be old-fashioned housewives. The four women have found men who share their vintage obsession, and have turned their homes into vintage shrines, wilfully ignoring most aspects of modern life.
| 18 | "The Murder of Billie-Jo: Sion Jenkins' Story" | Anoop Pandhals | TBA | 15 August 2008 | 203 |
In February 1997 13-year-old East Sussex schoolgirl Billie-Jo Jenkins was beaten to death in her back garden. Her foster father, Sion Jenkins, was convicted of murdering her. However, he was subsequently retried twice; with no verdict having been served, he was acquitted, and is currently free. The case remains unsolved. In this film Anoop Pandhals follows Sion Jenkins over four months as he prepares to tell his side of the story of his foster's daughter's murder.
| 19 | "Watch Me Disappear" | Lucy Cohen | TBA | 22 August 2008 | 204 |
Lucy Cohen's extraordinary directorial debut telling the woeful story surrounding the 2,500 people each year in Britain who are buried alone. No one claims them, and no one attends their funerals.
| 20 | "A1: The Road Musical" | Benjamin Till | TBA | 29 August 2008 | 205 |
A1: The Road Musical travels the A1 from London to Edinburgh to tell the surprising stories of ordinary people who live or work along the road, sung and spoken by the people themselves. Finding people local to the road through word of mouth and the press, Till interviewed them about their stories, adapted them as song lyrics and set them to music. He then coached, choreographed and directed their performances. The result is both a tragic-comic tale of love, life and lay-bys on the A1 and a compelling portrait of contemporary Britain.
| 21 | "Marriage Technique for Beginners" | Piers Sanderson | TBA | 5 September 2008 | 206 |
Director Piers Sanderson is getting married, but he is feeling nervous. As the product of a particularly painful divorce, he is keen not to put his own children through what he experienced as a small child. Featuring stylised animation and a long journey around the UK that features interviews with a cross-section of couples up and down the country, the film follows Piers's attempts to write his marriage vows as his big day approaches.
| 22 | "Pussies Galore" | Ceri Whitby | TBA | 12 September 2008 | 207 |
Britain is a nation of cat-lovers: we keep more than seven million as pets, buy 400,000 tonnes of cat food every week, and spend £55 million on cat toys every year. Ceri Whitby goes on a journey to discover what Britain loves about the common moggy.
| 23 | "My Boyfriend The Serial Killer" | Tanya Freedman | TBA | 19 September 2008 | 208 |
Earlier in 2008, Steve Wright was sentenced to life imprisonment for the murders of five women from the Ipswich area. His unsuspecting partner Pam Wright was left to pick up the pieces of her shattered life. Tanya Freedman’s debut film for the First Cut documentary strand follows Pam over two months as she makes a new life for herself in Devon, after leaving a police safe house. But how do you move on when your boyfriend is a serial killer?
| 24 | "Half Ton Veg" | TBA | TBA | 26 September 2008 | 209 |
Documentary following three men who are obsessed with growing large vegetables for competition, and the plight of their long-suffering wives. Featuring a Mansfield couple who haven't been on holiday for 30 years as husband Joe is unwilling to be parted from his outsized vegetables, a man who has won the "best of show" prize at the UK Giant Vegetable Championships for 10 consecutive years, and a newcomer to the pursuit.
| 25 | "Britain's Whitest Family" | Waheed Khan | TBA | 3 October 2008 | 210 |
Waheed Khan directs this intriguing documentary following three young men who suffer from albinism. Extraordinarily, two of them have siblings who are also albinos. In the case of one, the coincidence is explained by the fact that both his parents are albinos, matched as a couple in their native Pakistan at a young age for fear they would remain partnerless. The three adolescents followed by Khan face varying degrees of prejudice. One of them, Joey, the only ethnically white subject of the film, has been the victim of frequent bullying. The visual conspicuousness of these teenagers makes their search for inner identity all the more affecting.
| 26 | "Junk Mail Britain" | Mark Craig | TBA | 10 October 2008 | 211 |
Here, Mark Craig collects the junk mail that comes through the letterbox and meets the people who send them out - the estate agent, the pizza shop owner, the organic-food distributor, the Jehovah’s Witness, and so on. In doing so, he discovers a shared humanity lurking behind those despised leaflets.
| 27 | "Jail Date" | Lizzie Wingham | Blast! Films | 15 November 2008 | 212 |
There have been many cases of women falling in love with convicted murderers on death row, but what of the men who develop relationships with women prisoners? This oddly compelling edition of First Cut looks at a handful of men who have used prison-dating websites to meet women behind bars.

== Series 3 (2009) ==
| No. | Title | Directed by | Produced by | Original release date | Prod. code |
|---|---|---|---|---|---|
| 28 | "The Hunt For Britain's Tightest Person" | Claire Braden | TBA | 9 January 2009 | 301 |
With the credit crunch biting deep, money-saving has become the nation's favourite hobby. The first film in the new run of First Cut, by new director Claire Braden, looks at what happens when money-saving spills into madness. Claire meets the men and women who have devoted their lives to saving money in the most extraordinary ways.
| 29 | "Shopping The Family" | Tom Pearson | TBA | 16 January 2009 | 302 |
Tom Pearson's film follows two parents who turned their children in to the police after discovering they had committed crimes, and the difficulties each parent faced in making a complicated moral decision on the matter, and the consequences of their choice: keep the crime a secret, or turn their children into the authorities.
| 30 | "My Dad the Serial Killer" | TBA | TBA | 30 January 2009 | 303 |
In 2008, Levi Bellfield was sentenced to life imprisonment for the murders of two women and the attempted murder of a third. His unsuspecting family were left to pick up the pieces of their shattered lives. This documentary follows Bellfield's eldest daughter Bobbie-Louise as she approaches her 18th birthday hoping for a future free from the burden of her father. Though free from guilt for any of Bellfield's crimes, the family was vilified by the community and the children were bullied at school. They recall the years being victim to their father's abusive and often strange behaviour. There was no episode on Friday 23 January due to the launch of Celebrity Big Brother.
| 31 | "Squirrel Wars: Red vs Grey" | Luke Sewell | TBA | 6 February 2009 | 304 |
Paul Parker is a hunter. A hunter with a singular mission: to kill every grey squirrel in Northumberland. Unfortunately for Paul, he's outnumbered two million to one by the little Yankee bleeders. To licensed pest-control officer Paul, grey squirrels are recent immigrants. They came to Britain in the 1820s from America and their population has been multiplying ever since. The main losers in the squirrel wars have been the British red squirrels, falling victim to a deadly squirrel plague whenever the greys move into their patch. It seems that Britain isn't big enough for the both of them.
| 32 | "The Seven Ages of Love" | TBA | TBA | 13 February 2009 | 305 |
Poet Luke Wright teams up with director Zara Hayes to create Seven Ages of Love, a short film that combines both documentary and performance poetry to give seven differing perspectives on what 'love' means in Britain today.
| 33 | "Break In and Make My Day" | Jamie Balment | TBA | 20 February 2009 | 306 |
First-time director Jamie Balment explores the extreme lengths to which some British homeowners will go to defend their property from burglars and intruders. An Englishman's home has always been his castle, and today's castles are being fortified with the most advanced security systems ever known.
| 34 | "Hello Dollies" | Cat McShane | TBA | 27 February 2009 | 307 |
First-time filmmaker Cat McShane delves into the little-known world of adult doll's house enthusiasts, exploring the attraction of creating miniature worlds through the stories of some very British eccentrics. Hello Dollies offers a window into these charming houses and explores what drives these British enthusiasts to create tiny, perfect worlds.
| 35 | "Soldier Girls On The Road To Afghanistan" | Vanessa Stockley | TBA | 27 February 2009 | 308 |
First-time filmmaker Vanessa Stockley's powerful and moving film is a raw and intimate portrait of two women from very different backgrounds as they face the final stages of their officer training at Sandhurst Military Academy before being sent to Afghanistan.
