= Hypermastia =

Hypermastia may refer to:

- Accessory breasts
- Breast hypertrophy
