= Sarah Mulvey =

- Born: 13 May 1974
- Died: 28 January 2010 (aged 35)
- Education: Somerville College
- Occupation: television producer

Sarah Mulvey (13 May 1974 – 28 January 2010) was a British commissioning editor and television producer. She worked for Channel 4 from 2006 until her death in 2010. She commissioned and produced shows such as Secret Millionaire, How to Look Good Naked, Brat Camp, 10 Years Younger (UK) and Who Rules the Roost. She created the First Cut strand showcasing new and first time directors.

== Life ==
Mulvey was educated at both Somerville College, University of Oxford, where she read English, and Cambridge University where she studied for an M.Phil in English and American Literature.

She was found dead in the London flat she shared with her long term partner Mark, on 28 January 2010.

A coroner's enquiry concluded she committed suicide by opiate toxicity.
