= Udder =

Organ formed of mammary glands on the females of dairy animals

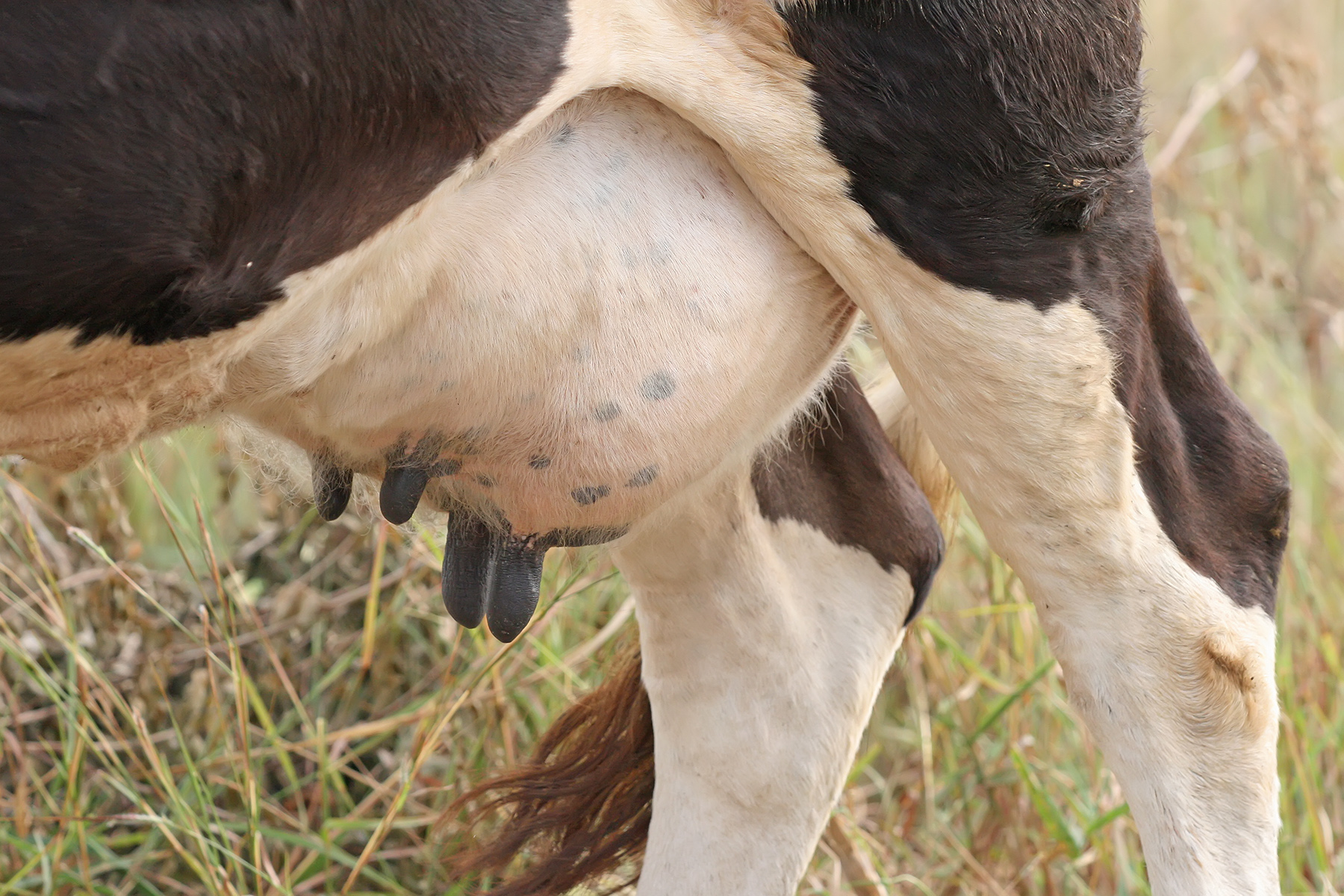
Udder of a cow

An udder is an organ formed of two or four mammary glands on the females of dairy animals and ruminants such as cattle, goats, and sheep. An udder is equivalent to the breast in primates and other mammals. The udder is a single mass hanging beneath the animal, consisting of pairs of mammary glands with protruding teats. In cattle, camels and deer, there are normally two pairs, in sheep and goats, there is one pair, and in some animals, there are many pairs. In animals with udders, the mammary glands develop on the milk line near the groin.

Udder care and hygiene in cows is important in milking, aiding uninterrupted and untainted milk production, and preventing mastitis. Products exist to soothe the chapped skin of the udder. This helps prevent bacterial infection, and reduces irritation during milking by the cups, and so the cow is less likely to kick the cups off. It has been demonstrated that incorporating nutritional supplements into diet, including vitamin E, is an additional method of improving udder health and reducing infection.

== Etymology ==
Udder has been attested in Middle English as udder or uddyr (also as uther, iddyr), and in Old English as ūder. It was evolved from the Proto-Germanic reconstructed root *eudrą or *ūdrą, which in turn descended from Proto-Indo-European *h₁ówHdʰr̥ (“udder”). It is cognate with Saterland Frisian Jadder (“udder”), Dutch uier (“udder”), German Euter (“udder”), Swedish juver (“udder”), Icelandic júgur (“udder”), Vedic Sanskrit ऊधर् (ū́dhar), Ancient Greek οὖθαρ (oûthar), and Latin ūber.

== Culinary use ==
The udder, or elder in Ireland, Scotland and northern England, of a slaughtered cow was in times past prepared and consumed. In other countries, like Italy, parts of Pakistan, Kenya, and some South American countries, cow udder is still consumed in dishes like the traditional teteun and ubres asada.

== Microbial ecology ==
The udder microbiome of cows can act as a defense mechanism for preventing infection and can impact the production and quality of milk. The presence of Staphylococcus – specifically S. aureus, S. uberis, and S. agalactiae – on the teat apex can lead to intramammary infections (IMI) if it migrates to the teat canal and the mammary gland. These infections trigger the mammary gland immune response and can lead to decreased milk production. The 4 major phyla associated with a healthy teat apex include Actinobacteria, Bacteroidetes, Firmicutes, and Proteobacteria. Some of these non-aureus staphylococci (NAS) can release bacteriocins that inhibit the growth of S. aureus and prevent infection whereas the microbiome of dairy cows with IMI can be categorized with an increased prevalence of Staphylococcus and decreased diversity. IMIs can also impact the quality and composition of the proteins found in milk. The loss of milk production and increased waste of milk due to lower quality make IMIs one of the leading causes of economic losses in the milk industry.

Environmental factors can play a role in shaping the diversity and composition of these communities. The udder is completely exposed to the both indoor and outdoor environments and comes into direct contact with areas such as bedding, milking equipment, and feces. These bacteria can then seed raw milk with potential pathogens that affect safety and spoilage organisms that affect quality. For example, S. aureus is naturally found on the external teat skin. Listeria monocytogenes is commonly found in the environment and is associated with improper cleaning and sanitation. Pseudomonas spp. are known spoilage organisms in milk and are often found in environments such as soil. While pasteurization can eliminate or reduce these bacteria, high initial bacterial loads could allow some of these to persist post-pasteurization. Effective cleaning and sanitation of the cow’s housing environment and the udder surface can help prevent contamination of raw milk. Antimicrobials can also be used to prevent bacteria growth on the udder surface, however, consideration is needed before use to prevent antimicrobial resistance.
