= TFAP2B =

Human gene and protein

Identifiers
- Aliases: TFAP2B, AP-2B, AP2-B, transcription factor AP-2 beta, PDA2, AP-2beta
- External IDs: OMIM: 601601; MGI: 104672; GeneCards: TFAP2B

Gene location (Human)
Chr.	Chromosome 6 (human)
Band	6p12.3	Start	50,818,723 bp
Band	6p12.3	End	50,847,619 bp

Gene location (Mouse)
Chr.	Chromosome 1 (mouse)
Band	1|1 A3	Start	19,279,138 bp
Band	1|1 A3	End	19,308,800 bp
RNA expression pattern
Bgee	Human / Mouse (ortholog); Top expressed in: corpus epididymis; tail of epididymis; oocyte; secondary oocyte; parotid gland; buccal mucosa cell; palpebral conjunctiva; renal medulla; epithelium of lactiferous gland; lactiferous duct / Top expressed in: neural layer of retina; connecting tubule; parotid gland; thin ascending limb of loop of Henle; hair follicle; superior cervical ganglion; maxillary prominence; conjunctival fornix; iris; lacrimal gland; More reference expression data
BioGPS	n/a
Gene ontology
Molecular function	DNA binding; transcription coactivator activity; sequence-specific DNA binding; transcription corepressor activity; protein dimerization activity; protein homodimerization activity; DNA-binding transcription factor activity; DNA-binding transcription activator activity, RNA polymerase II-specific; chromatin binding; RNA polymerase II general transcription initiation factor activity; cysteine-type endopeptidase inhibitor activity involved in apoptotic process; protein binding; cis-regulatory region sequence-specific DNA binding; protein heterodimerization activity; RNA polymerase II core promoter sequence-specific DNA binding; DNA-binding transcription factor activity, RNA polymerase II-specific; RNA polymerase II cis-regulatory region sequence-specific DNA binding; RNA polymerase II transcription regulatory region sequence-specific DNA binding
Cellular component	nucleus; nucleoplasm
Biological process	negative regulation of neuron apoptotic process; forelimb morphogenesis; collecting duct development; cellular urea homeostasis; regulation of transcription, DNA-templated; sympathetic nervous system development; retina layer formation; positive regulation of urine volume; glucose homeostasis; calcium ion homeostasis; distal tubule development; kidney development; regulation of insulin secretion; phosphate ion homeostasis; cellular creatinine homeostasis; negative regulation of apoptotic process; transcription by RNA polymerase II; metanephric nephron development; aorta morphogenesis; magnesium ion homeostasis; hindlimb morphogenesis; transcription, DNA-templated; response to lithium ion; regulation of BMP signaling pathway; positive regulation of transcription, DNA-templated; positive regulation of neuron apoptotic process; cellular ammonium homeostasis; potassium ion homeostasis; positive regulation of cell population proliferation; renal water homeostasis; glucose metabolic process; sensory organ development; regulation of cell differentiation; sodium ion homeostasis; negative regulation of transcription, DNA-templated; fat cell differentiation; ductus arteriosus closure; negative regulation of cell population proliferation; skin development; apoptotic process; negative regulation of cysteine-type endopeptidase activity involved in apoptotic process; negative regulation of transcription by RNA polymerase II; positive regulation of transcription by RNA polymerase II; regulation of transcription by RNA polymerase II
Sources:Amigo / QuickGO
Orthologs
Databases	NCBI: entry; OMA: entry
Species	Human	Mouse
Entrez	7021	21419
Ensembl	ENSG00000008196	ENSMUSG00000025927
UniProt	Q92481	Q61313
RefSeq (mRNA)	NM_003221	NM_001025305; NM_001286340; NM_009334
RefSeq (protein)	NP_003212	NP_001020476; NP_001273269; NP_033360
Location (UCSC)	Chr 6: 50.82 – 50.85 Mb	Chr 1: 19.28 – 19.31 Mb
PubMed search
- Wikidata
View/Edit Human	View/Edit Mouse

Transcription factor AP-2 beta also known as AP2-beta is a protein that in humans is encoded by the TFAP2B gene.

== Function ==
AP-2 beta is a member of the AP-2 family of transcription factors. AP-2 proteins form homo- or hetero-dimers with other AP-2 family members and bind specific DNA sequences. They are thought to stimulate cell proliferation and suppress terminal differentiation of specific cell types during embryonic development. Specific AP-2 family members differ in their expression patterns and binding affinity for different promoters. This protein functions as both a transcriptional activator and repressor.

== Clinical significance ==
Mutations in this gene result in autosomal dominant Char syndrome, suggesting that this gene functions in the differentiation of neural crest cell derivatives.
