= Fleischer's syndrome =

- Specialty: Medical genetics

Fleischer's syndrome is an extremely rare congenital anomaly characterized by displacement of the nipples, occasional polymastia, and hypoplasia of both kidneys.
