= Supernumerary nipple =

Occurrence of an additional nipple in mammals

- Other names: Third nipple, triple nipple, accessory nipple, polythelia
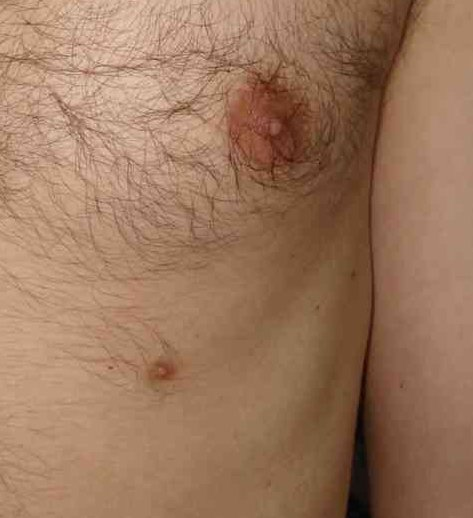
- Specialty: Medical genetics, dermatology

A supernumerary nipple is an additional instance of nipple occurring in mammals, including humans and monkeys. They are often mistaken for moles. Studies variously report the prevalence of supernumerary nipples as approximately 1 in 18 and 1 in 40.

The nipples appear along the two vertical "milk lines", which start in the armpit on each side, run down through the typical nipples and end at the groin. They are classified into eight levels of completeness, from a simple patch of hair to a milk-bearing breast in miniature.

== Types ==
Type	Glandular tissue	Nipple	Areola	Fat tissue	Hair patch
1	yes	yes	yes	yes	
2	yes	yes			
3	yes		yes		
4	yes				
5 ("pseudomamma")		yes	yes	yes	
6 ("polythelia")		yes			
7 ("polythelia areolaris")			yes		
8 ("polythelia pilosa")					yes

Polythelia refers to the presence of an additional nipple alone, while polymastia denotes the much rarer presence of additional mammary glands.

Although usually presenting on the milk line, pseudomamma can appear as far away as the foot.

== Clinical significance ==
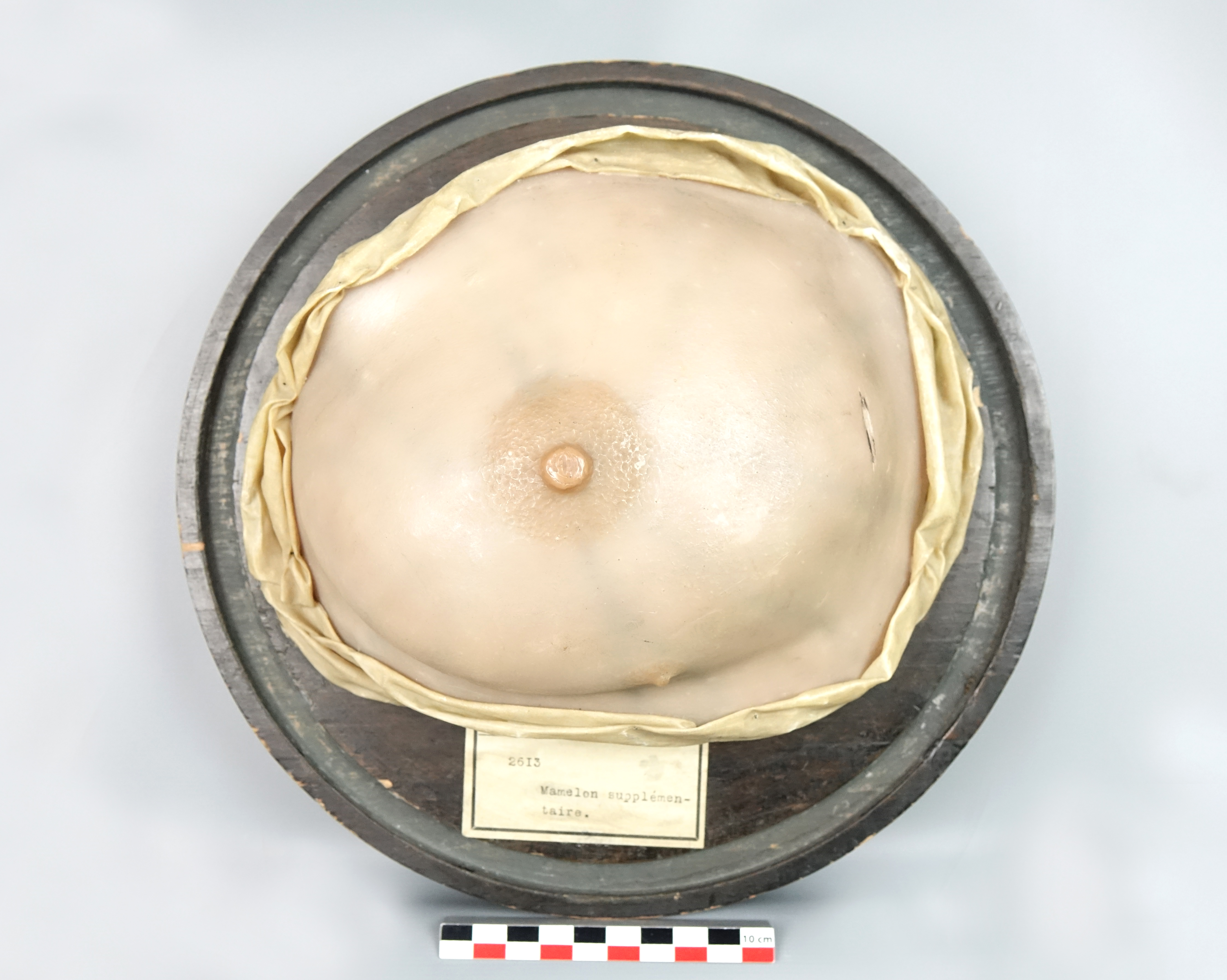
Wax model of a breast with a supernumerary nipple (Sorbonne University)

=== Clinical presentation ===
It may remain undetected. Occasionally, the supernumerary nipple is noticed when hormonal changes during adolescence, menstruation, or pregnancy cause increased pigmentation, fluctuating swelling, tenderness, or even lactation.

=== Associations ===
It is said to be found in association with many syndromes and other conditions:

- McKusick–Kaufman syndrome
- Char syndrome
- Simpson–Golabi–Behmel syndrome

A possible connection with mitral valve prolapse has been proposed.

=== Treatment and prognosis ===
Most often no treatment is required; however, a protruding embarrassing supernumerary nipple can be removed surgically, if desired. Removal using liquid nitrogen cryotherapy has also been described.

== Society and culture ==
=== Television ===
The Triple Nipple Club is a documentary shown on Channel 4 which explored the biological mystery of the supernumerary nipple. First broadcast on 2 January 2008, it was directed and produced by Dan Louw and commissioned as part of Channel 4's First Cut series. The film focuses on Louw's attempts to understand why he was born with extra nipples, a condition he shares with the likes of Mark Wahlberg, Lily Allen, and Tilda Swinton, as well as TV and film characters such as the James Bond villain Francisco Scaramanga and Chandler Bing from Friends. Fascinated and confused by this seemingly pointless mutation, Louw sets off on a personal journey of discovery to try to unwrap "the riddle of the triple nipple". He starts out by consulting the man in the street and a renowned teratologist, an expert in physical mutations. After testing the notion that extra nipples could be a sign of fertility, he discovers that they are actually an atavism, or evolutionary 'holdover'—a sign of how humans evolved.

English pop-star Harry Styles confirmed in 2017 that he has four nipples as a result of the condition.

== See also ==
- Accessory breast
- Grace Sherwood, sentenced to jail for witchcraft partly on the basis of having "two things like titts on her private parts of a black coller [color]"
- Polydactyly
- Witch's mark
