= Emily James (filmmaker) =

American-British filmmaker (born 1971)

- Born: Emily Nöel James; December 24, 1971 (age 54)
- Occupation: Filmmaker
- Years active: 2000–present
- Children: 1
- Website: www.emily-james.com

Emily Nöel James (born 24 December 1971) is an American-British filmmaker and activist.

== Early life and education ==
James was born in California and completed her Bachelor of Arts at UC Berkeley. James migrated to the United Kingdom, where she completed a Masters of Philosophy in History and Philosophy of Science at Cambridge University. In 2000, she graduated with a degree in documentary directing from the UK National Film and Television School.

== Film career ==
=== Film school ===
While still at the UK National Film and Television School, James' film Wag the Dogma was acquired by Channel 4 and E4 (their digital channel). The film won the Jury Award for Best Documentary Short at the 2001 Atlanta Film Festival. James’ graduation film, the 2001 A Brief History of Cuba in D Minor, featured Russell Brand.

=== Channel 4 years ===
In 2002, James was commissioned by the Channel 4 to create The Luckiest Nut in the World, at a time of international protests against the World Trade Organisation, the International Monetary Fund and the World Bank. The Luckiest Nut demonstrated how free trade could trigger a downward poverty spiral in developing economies who depend on nut production. The film won the 2003 Full Frame Documentary Film Festival Jury Award for Best Short. The Luckiest Nut was picked up by Christian Aid, who turned it into a campaign called “Trade Rules are Nuts, Let’s Crack’m!’. This educational campaign taught young people about the effects of trade on developing countries, and James was proud that the film “reached so many young minds”.

In 2004, James created and directed Don’t Worry, a satirical puppet TV show for Channel 4.

=== Executive producing ===
In 2005, James started executive producing, with What Would Jesus Drive?, investigating American car culture and oil dependence. In 2007, James was worked with Dallas Campbell on his Guide to the Impossible and Dallas in Wonderland.

In 2009, James co-executive produced Franny Armstrong’s The Age of Stupid, a part-fiction, part-documentary about the effects of climate change in 2055. James also executive produced a behind-the-scenes The Making of the Age of Stupid for The Guardian.

Working with Armstrong was a turning point for James, as she realised there was a way of making independent documentaries that weren’t reliant on TV studio funding.

=== Just Do It ===
In 2008, James was approached by activist group Plane Stupid to record their action shutting down Stansted Airport, which caused flight cancellations on the day. This event led to James’ first directional debut, the observational documentary Just Do It: A Tale of Modern-day Outlaws. Through filming the Plane Stupid action and seeing the resulting media coverage, James felt that the activists’ stories and messages were “not being captured for prosperity”. In the making of Just Do It, James gained behind-the-scenes access to three climate justice groups in the UK, in the lead up to the COP15 in Copenhagen in 2009. The access she gained allowed her to document the "disproportionate" police violence at the climate summit. Rather than convincing people about the existence of climate change, James hoped that the film would make people more sympathetic towards direct action tactics.

Instead of relying on a commission from a TV network as she had in the past, to fund Just Do It James explicitly sought crowdfunding, private donations and grants. This allowed her to work with people with criminal records, which she had been advised against by Channel 4. James adopted strategies to protect the safety of activists, such as employing runners to take any tapes away from the scene as frequently as possible, and storing tapes in a safehouse. The film received a British Film Institute release and screened in over 45 independent cinemas across the UK in the summer of 2011.

=== Other feature films ===
In 2013, James started directing Silk Road: Drugs, Death and the Dark Web, about the billion-dollar digital drugs cartel black market website Silk Road. The film was later released in 2017 and became a co-production with BBC and A&E in America. In 2024, James began working with author Cory Doctorow on a documentary version of his book, Enshittification: Why Everything Suddenly Got Worse and What To Do About It.

=== Comedy and drama directing ===
During the 2020 coronavirus pandemic, James created and directed the dark-comedy series, Coronaville. She recruited a team of volunteer writers, cast and crew, doing a call-out on social media. The project filmed actors in their homes and was directed over Zoom, using actors’ own phones to film the content remotely. Actors on the show took on the additional roles of set designers and lighting teams, to allow a “socially distanced filmmaking”. Though completed in 2021, Coronaville was released in 2024.

In 2024, James directed Develop, a drama film about a dying mother and daughter bonding over a photography project.

== Film and TV works ==
- Wag the Dogma (2000)
- A Brief History of Cuba, in D Minor (2001)
- The Luckiest Nut in the World (2002)
- Don’t Worry (2004) – 4 episodes
- What Would Jesus Drive? (2005)
- The Battle for Broadway Market (2006)
- Guide to the Impossible (2007)
- GWANO – “The Global World Action News Organisation” (2007)
- The Age of Stupid (2009)
- Just Do It: A Tale of Modern-day Outlaws (2011) – this was James’ directional debut.
- Silk Road: Drugs, Death, and the Dark Web (2017)
- Coronaville – 3 episodes (2021)
- Develop (2024)
- Enshittification: The Film (upcoming)

== Personal views ==
James has been vocal about the financial challenges of working as an independent filmmaker, noting that film production crew are often paid before directors, with structural underpayment built into the system. James notes that it’s “not as sexy to fund a documentary as it is a fiction film”. For Just Do It, James raised money through crowdfunding, private donations, and grants, but noted that this strategy only covered a fraction of the required costs.
