= Char syndrome =

- Other names: Patent ductus arteriosus with facial dysmorphism and abnormal fifth digits
- Specialty: Medical genetics

Char syndrome is an autosomal dominant congenital disease caused by mutations in TFAP2B gene which affects the development of the bones of the face as well as the heart and limbs. During embryo development, TFAP2B regulates the production of the protein AP-2β, a transcription factor that is active in the neural crest and helps regulate genes that control cell division and apoptosis. There are at least 10 mutations of this gene that have been identified in people presenting Char syndrome, which alters specific regions of the gene preventing production of the transcription factor and disrupting normal development of embryo structures. People with this condition present a very distinct facial appearance with flattened cheek bones, flat and broad tip nose, shortened distance between the nose and upper lip, triangular-shaped mouth with tick lips and strabismus. It is also characterized by a patent ductus arteriosus, which is the failure to close the ductus that connects the aorta and pulmonary artery during pre-birth life and may cause many symptoms including breathing issues and heart failure. Abnormalities of hand and finger development have also been reported in people with this condition, including short or absent fifth finger. Other abnormal findings include supernumerary nipples. These conditions often affect multiple members of a family and there are no reports of non-genetic factors that might be related with incidence of this syndrome. It was first described by Florence Char in 1978.
