= Accessory breast =

Condition of having an additional breast

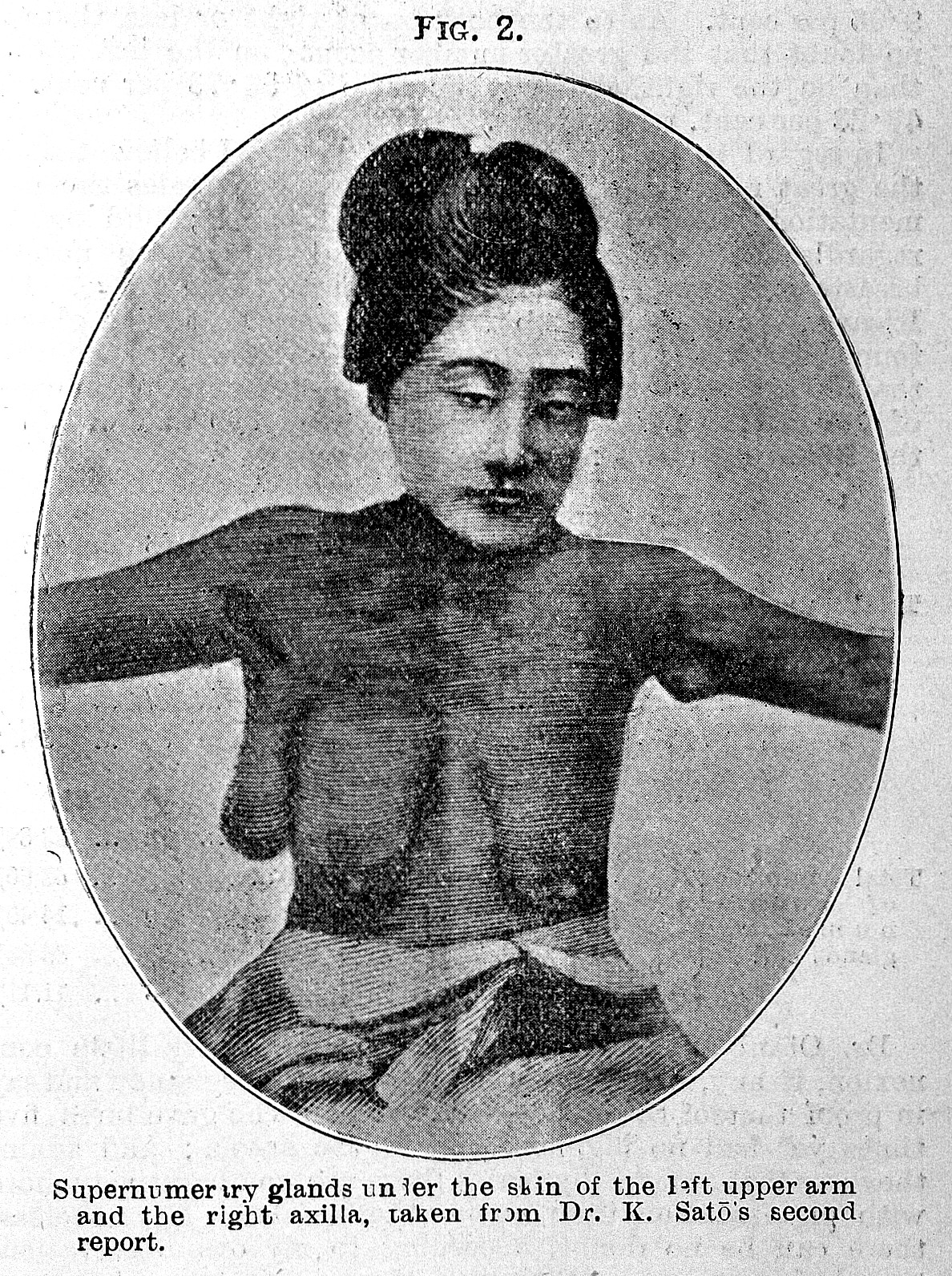
- A woman with several accessory breasts
- Specialty: Medical genetics

Accessory breasts, also known as polymastia, supernumerary breasts, or mammae erraticae, is the atavistic condition of having an additional breast. These extra breasts may appear with or without nipples or areolae. The condition is most commonly observed in males and is generally harmless, often going untreated, but many affected individuals opt to undergo plastic surgery to remove the additional breasts for aesthetic reasons.

Polythelia is a related condition in which one or more additional nipples form in the absence of developed breast tissue.

== Presentation ==
In some cases, the accessory breast may not be visible at the surface; in these cases, it is sometimes possible to distinguish their appearance from normal breast tissue via MRI. Some individuals with accessory breasts experience lactation.

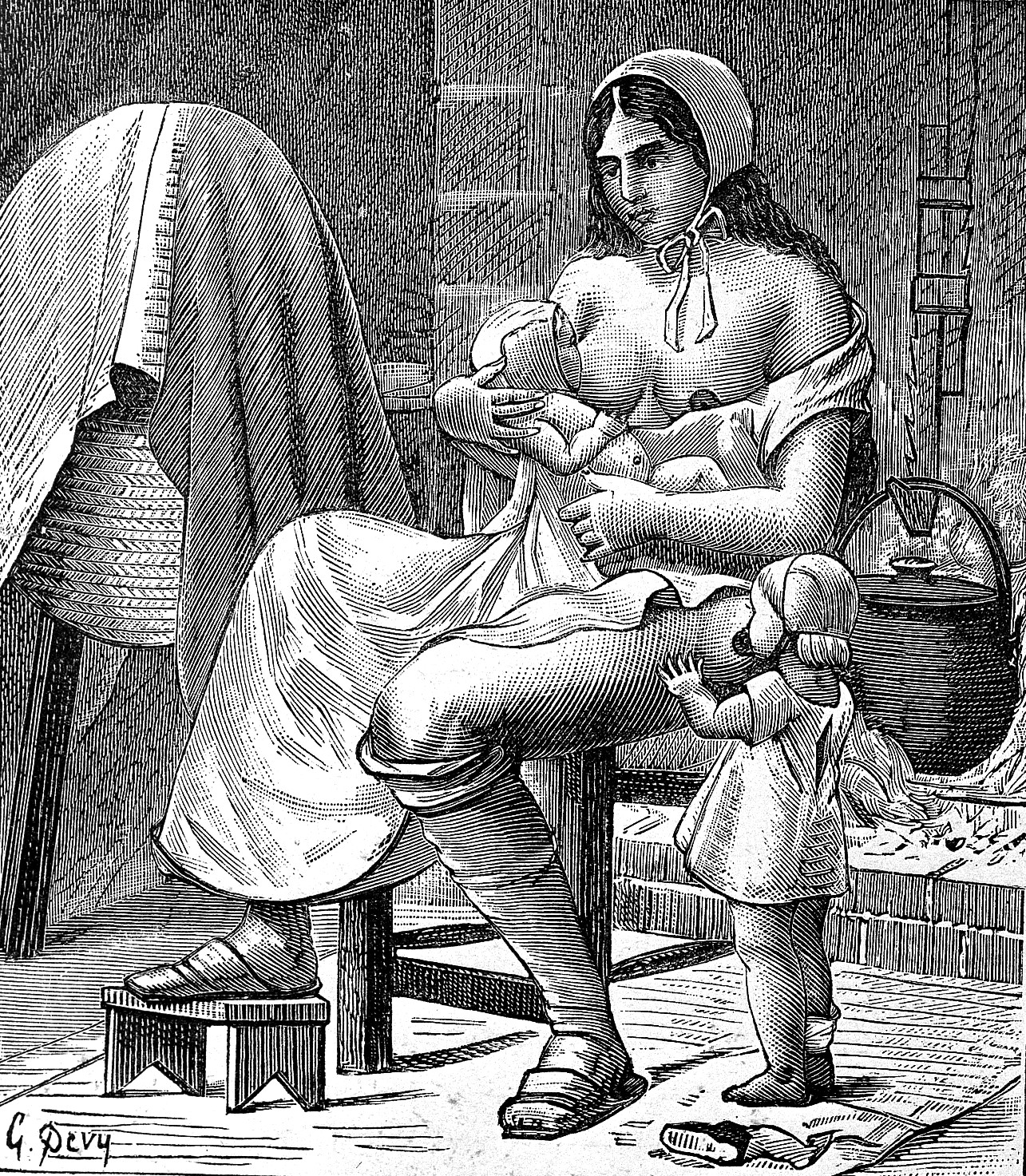
A drawing depicting a child nursing at an ectopic breast on the lateral thigh

There is some evidence that the condition may be more common in Native American populations.

== Cause ==
Polymastia typically occurs in the womb during development. During normal development, breast tissue will develop along the milk line, and additional tissue will disintegrate and be absorbed into the body. Polymastia occurs when the additional tissue does not disintegrate before birth. This condition can be inherited.

== See also ==
- Artemis § As the Lady of Ephesus (fertility goddess with many breasts)
- Fleischer's syndrome
