= Mammary ridge =

Primordium specific for the development of the mammary gland

Mammary crest
- Natural milk lines in the human body

Details

Identifiers
- Latin: crista mammaria

The mammary ridge or mammary crest is a primordium specific for the development of mammary glands.

== Development ==
The mammary ridge is primordial for the mammary glands on the chest in humans, and is associated with mammary gland and breast development.

In human embryogenesis, the mammary ridge usually appears as a narrow, microscopic ectodermal thickening during the first seven weeks of pregnancy and grows caudally as a narrow, linear ridge. In many mammals, these glands first appear as elevated ridges along the milk lines, which then separate into individual buds located in regions lateral to the ventral midline. The location of these buds varies according to species: they are located in the thoracic region in primates, in the inguinal area in ungulates, and along the entire length of the trunk in rodents and pigs.

A mammary ridge, or crest, usually stops growing at eight weeks and its length is regressed starting at the caudal end and extending cranially, so that what remains is a round, ectodermic placode where the axilla develops. When shortening of the mammary crest is complete, the structure remains prominent in the areas where the mammary glands eventually form. The mammary lines begin to shorten and ectodermal cells begin to divide and grow into the mesenchymal cell layer. A basement membrane separating the expanding ectodermal crest structure and the underlying mesoderm usually remains. The mammary ridge then becomes recognizable in the thoracic region in the human embryo. Nipples develop on the milk lines of therian mammals.

== In humans ==
In humans, milk lines form as thickenings of the epidermis of the mammary ridge, along the front surface of both sexes. Milk lines appear in the seventh week of embryonic development before human sexual differentiation, which explains why male humans have nipples. After initial development of the milk lines they go into remission. Most humans have two nipples, but in some cases more than two will develop. These additional nipples usually grow along the milk line.

A 2021 study suggests that focal fat pads on the front of human torsos are of mammary ridge origin. Eight pairs of fatty mounds were consistently found running along a curved line from the armpits to the groins in nearly all lean women and men, consistent with the location of the embryological mammary ridge line. This finding may explain why fat on the front of the body is less responsive to diet and exercise than fat elsewhere in most people—being of breast origin would make it more sensitive to hormonal influence than caloric intake or burn.

== See also ==
- Udder
- Lactation
