= Nipple pain in breastfeeding =

Nipple pain

Nipple pain is a common symptom of pain at the nipple that occurs in women during breastfeeding after childbirth. The pain shows the highest intensity during the third to the seventh day postpartum and becomes most severe on the third day postpartum.

Nipple pain can result from many conditions. Early nipple pain in breastfeeding is usually caused by improper positioning and latch while breastfeeding. Other causes may include blocked milk ducts, tongue-tie, cracked nipples and nipple infections by yeasts, bacteria or viruses. Complications in nursing women involve an increase in nipple sensitivity or breast engorgement, leading to mastitis and subsequent pain. Common diagnostic approaches include quantifying pain by the numerical rating scale (NRS) and maternal breast or infant mouth examinations.

Nipple pain may hinder breastfeeding and is the most common reason for early weaning. General management such as positioning and latch adjustment and thermal intervention can be administered for pain alleviation. Appropriate treatment of nipple pain is given based on the underlying cause.

== Causes ==
Causes of nipple pain in breastfeeding are classified into three factors: physiological, mechanical and infectious. They are interrelated and possibly happen simultaneously.

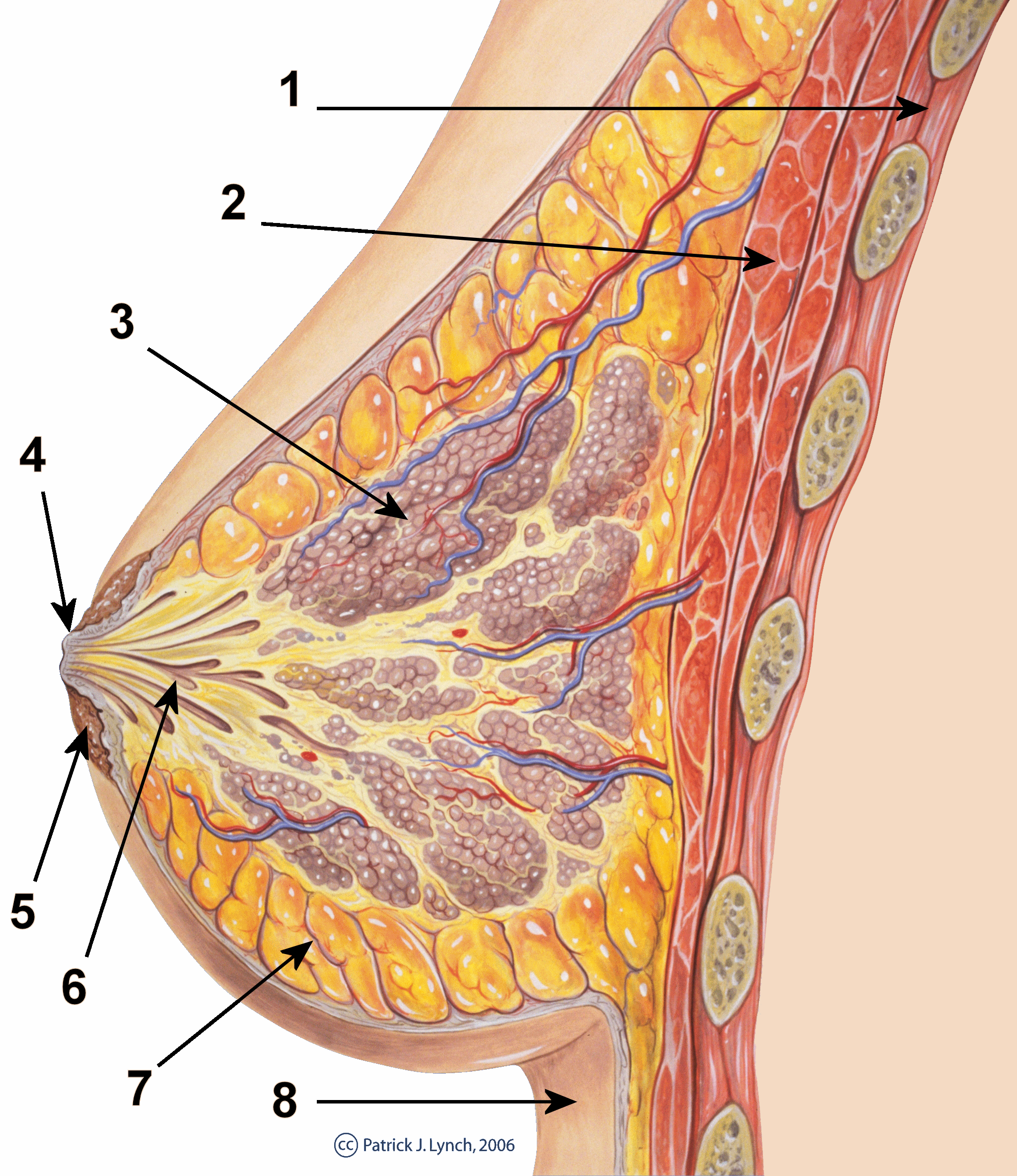
The cross-section of the breast. The blockage of milk ducts (Lactiferous ducts), labelled by 6, causes nipple pain.

=== Physiological factors ===
Physiological changes in nursing women, including an unusual milk supply and blocked milk ducts, cause nipple or breast ache. An oversupply of breast milk is caused by overactive milk expression. Hence, the excess milk accumulates, leading to breast engorgement and pain. On the other hand, milk supply will be lowered by prolonged breastfeeding, high pumping pressure and overly vigorous breast massage. Blocked milk ducts refers to lactiferous ducts' blockage at the nipple pore or deeper breast tissue. It hampers an adequate drainage of milk and causes breast mass, engorgement, redness, a nipple bleb and subsequent pain.

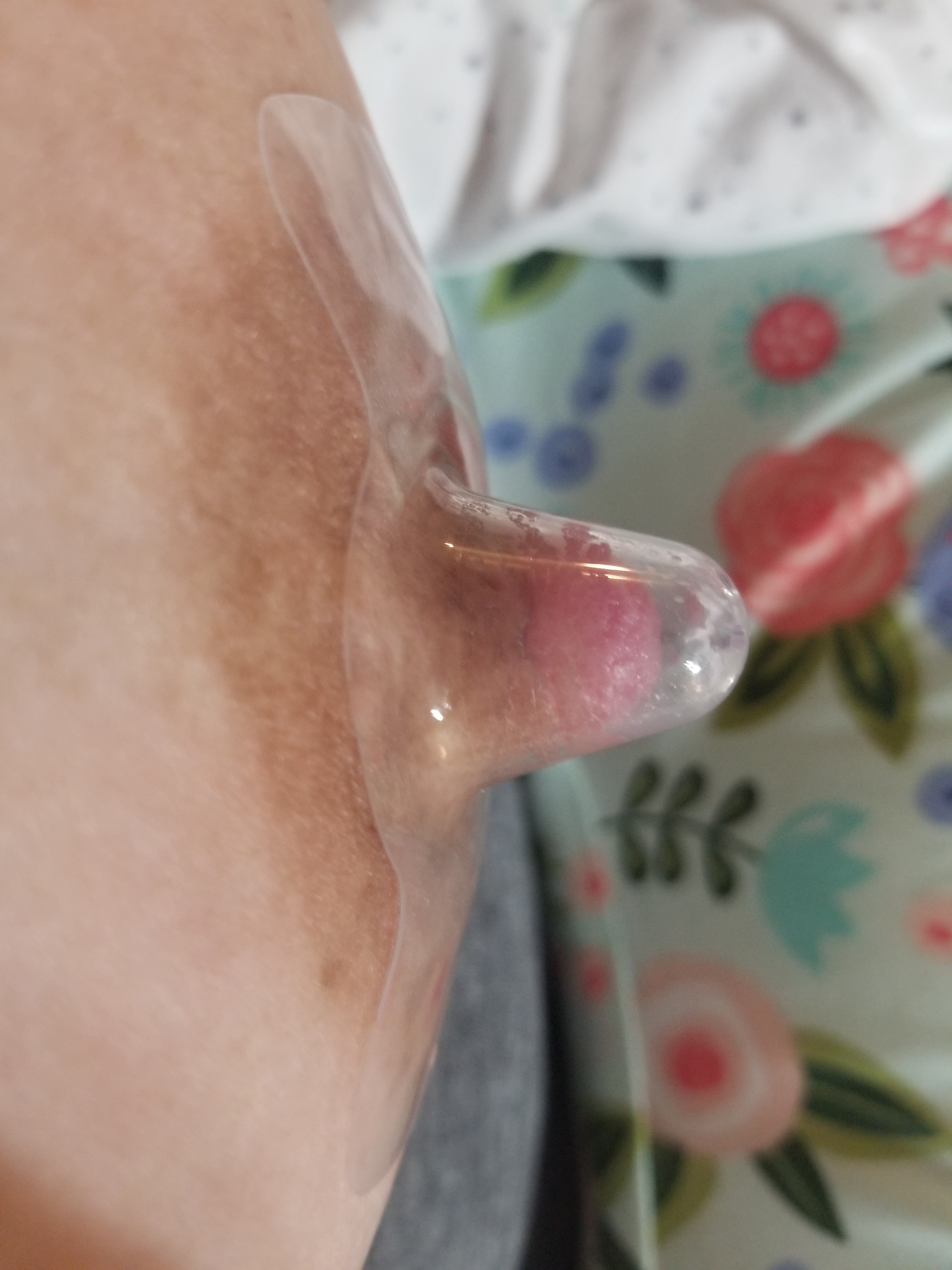
Correct placement of shield elongates nipple into shield.

=== Mechanical factors ===
==== Nipple trauma ====
Cracked nipples, including nipple blisters and fissure, increase the nipple pain frequency and intensity during the first week postpartum. Traumas may break down the skin integrity of the nipple and serve as routes for infections. A common complication is mastitis due to bacterial infections.

==== Poor positioning ====
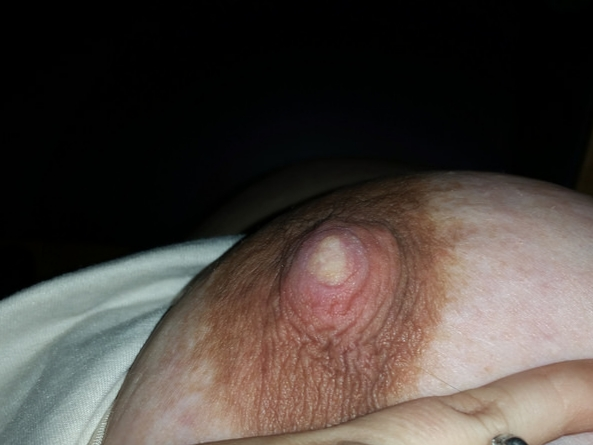
A symptom of poor positioning is nipple blanching due to reduced blood flow.

Poor positioning or poor latching of infants refers to the infant's inappropriate fastening onto the mother's nipple in breastfeeding. It is the most common cause of early and persistent nipple soreness. During breastfeeding, if the infant's mouth is not in the same plane as the mother's nipple and the infant's ears, shoulders and hips are not in parallel, the child cannot grasp enough portion of the nipple and areola into the mouth nor receive enough milk. The infant will sip more vigorously and thus reduce blood flow (ischemia) at the nipple which leads to vasospasm and blanched nipples.

==== Abnormal tongue motion ====
Abnormal tongue motion of infants is commonly caused by nipple confusion. When infants are given a rubber nipple and pacifier, they may sip at the maternal nipple as if it was a rubber nipple. The tongue movements used in breastfeeding and bottle-feeding are different: infants use a wave-like motion to remove breast milk in breastfeeding and thrusting action against the latex nipple to control milk flow in bottle-feeding. If the infant pinches and presses the nipple with the gums repeatedly, it creates a large friction and results in nipple soreness and bruising.

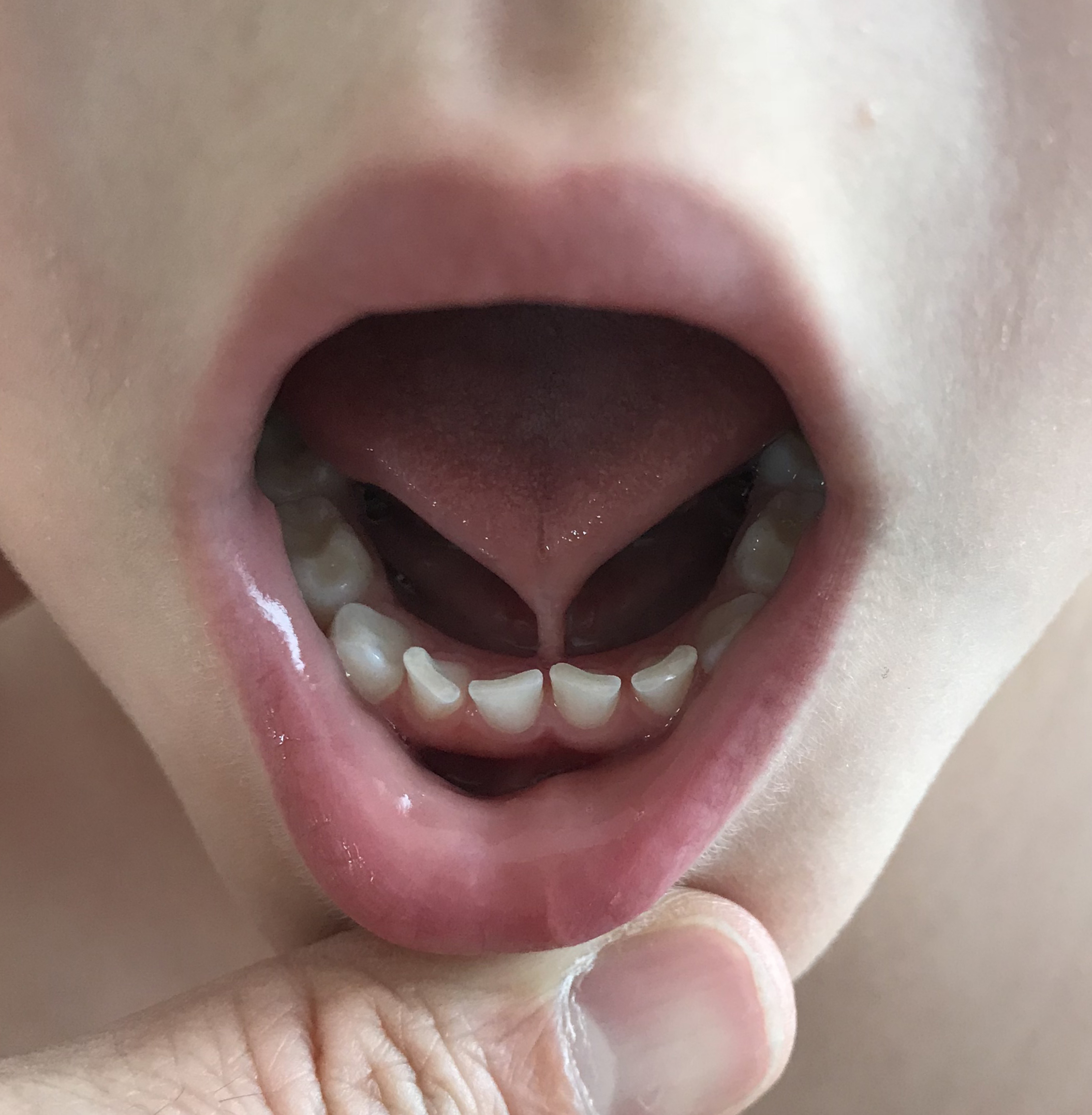
A child with tongue-tie indicated by an unusually short lingual frenulum which connects the bottom of the tongue to the floor of the mouth

==== Tongue-tie ====
Tongue-tie (Ankyloglossia or Tight frenulum) refers to an abnormally short and thick lingual frenulum that hinders the child from curving the tongue around the nipple. Hence, the infant drains insufficient breast milk and rubs harder against the nipple which causes nipple abrasion. It leads to suboptimal weight gain in babies and mechanical nipple injuries associated with nipple soreness and pain in mothers. Other congenital mouth abnormalities like cleft palate in infants can cause nipple irritation and increase the risk of nipple dermatitis in mothers.

=== Infectious factors ===
Nursing mothers diagnosed with yeast, bacterial, viral infections or dermatitis are susceptible to nipple pain. A type of yeast infection called candidiasis caused by a type of fungus called Candida will lead to itching, erythema of the nipple and areola, burning and stabbing nipple pain. It happens when the infant's mouth is infected by a Candida species called Candida albicans, the child may transmit the yeast to the mother's nipple during breastfeeding. Bacterial infection by Staphylococcus aureus (S.aureus) will give rise to mastitis which refers to an inflammation of the mammary gland. About half of the breastfeeding mothers reporting nipple ache were infected with S.aureus. They usually experienced a sudden onset and systemic symptoms including nipple pain, fever, flu-like symptoms, myalgia and fatigue. The risk of infections increases with an inhibition of mammary gland drainage. Viral infection with Herpes simplex virus (HSV) causes nipple ulceration, soreness and pain. Infants feeding on an HSV infected nipple can develop a life-threatening complication affecting the brain called encephalitis. Breastfeeding women with dermatitis problems, including psoriasis and eczema at the nipple, suffer from erythema, scaling lesion and pain. Nursing mothers with psoriasis may develop Koebner phenomenon upon further nipple abrasion by infants in prolonged breastfeeding. Eczema at the nipple can be caused by direct chemical contact or allergic condition. It affects the areola and sometimes extends to the breast.

== Diagnosis ==
The diagnosis of nipple pain in breastfeeding can be divided into three major parts: the measurement of pain intensity, a physical examination on the breastfeeding mother and the infant to identify the cause of pain and the study of the psychological impact of pain in the breastfeeding woman.

=== Pain scale ===
Acute or chronic pain can be directly measured by pain scales such as the numerical rating scale (NRS) and visual analog scale (VAS). A serial pain scale from 0 (no pain) to 10 (worst pain imaginable) can quantify pain intensity. It can also monitor symptom improvement in nursing women who experience persistent nipple pain for at least two weeks postpartum.

=== Clinical examination ===
Nipple pain is a symptom with many possible causes. A thorough maternal breast and infant mouth inspection can help identify the specific cause and thus assign the appropriate treatment. A maternal nipple examination can be used to diagnose traumatic factors including nipple fissure, nipple blisters and infections with prominent symptoms. A breast biopsy detecting breast mass can diagnose for breast engorgement. If a breast mass is present, a core needle biopsy and diagnostic imaging are required for further assessment of underlying causes, including mastitis, blocked milk ducts, cancers and benign breast tumours called lactating adenoma. By checking the infant mouth, causes like tongue-tie, candidiasis and abnormal tongue motion can be diagnosed.

=== The Edinburg Postpartum Depression Scale ===
Nipple pain may lead to psychological problems in women. The Edinburg Postpartum (or Postnatal) Depression Scale is a set of ten questions that is commonly used for assessing postpartum depression.

== Management ==
Generally, nipple pain levels will reduce after seven to ten days postpartum. For the constant nipple ache, painkiller can be taken by mothers to relieve the uncomfortableness while general management can be applied at the same time, mainly positioning correction, thermal intervention and breast milk drainage to prevent engorgement.

A short video demonstrating maternal milk expression and a proper latch of infants to the nipple during breastfeeding

=== Positioning, latch and breast milk drainage ===
Clinically, proper positioning and latch of infants to the nipple can resolve persistent nipple pain brought by inefficient milk flow and tongue-tie, avoid nipple trauma and fissure, prevent breast mastitis and allow efficient wound healing. Mothers can place the nipple asymmetrically in the top half of the infant's mouth. On the other hand, the continuation of effective and frequent breast milk drainage, especially draining the first milk production after childbirth called colostrum, can prevent the development of mastitis and engorgement. Common practices include manual expression, pumping and pressure-relief of the areola. Tools such as effective breast pumps and lubricants can be used to achieve the goal of successful draining and prevent the blockage of milk ducts. In addition, moderating the oversupply and the rapid flow of breast milk can effectively ameliorate painful feelings. If the pain is so severe that the drainage cannot be carried out, painkillers such as ibuprofen can be taken to minimize nipple ache for successful lactation.

=== Thermal intervention ===
There are two types of common thermal intervention for nipple pain, one is a warm compress while another is a cold compress. A warm compress such as a hot tea bag compress can be applied to the breast before breastfeeding to unblock the blocked milk ducts. By common practice, the solid lump that blocks the milk ducts should be resolved after 48 to 72 hours. Otherwise, assessing other possible causes of nipple pain such as lactating adenoma or malignancy is needed. It can also be applied to breast fissure sites as the vasodilation caused by the rise in temperature allows more oxygen and nutrients to help relieve pain and boost wound healing. Applying a cold compress can resolve breast engorgement. A cold gel pack, for example, can slightly reduce nipple pain caused by breast engorgement despite the effect has not yet been proved.

== Treatment ==
If nipple pain is not resolved effectively after general management, appropriate treatment can be directed at underlying causes. Nevertheless, except the general management mentioned before, all common therapeutic practices in treating nipple pain during breastfeeding are not proven to be effective yet.

=== Medication ===
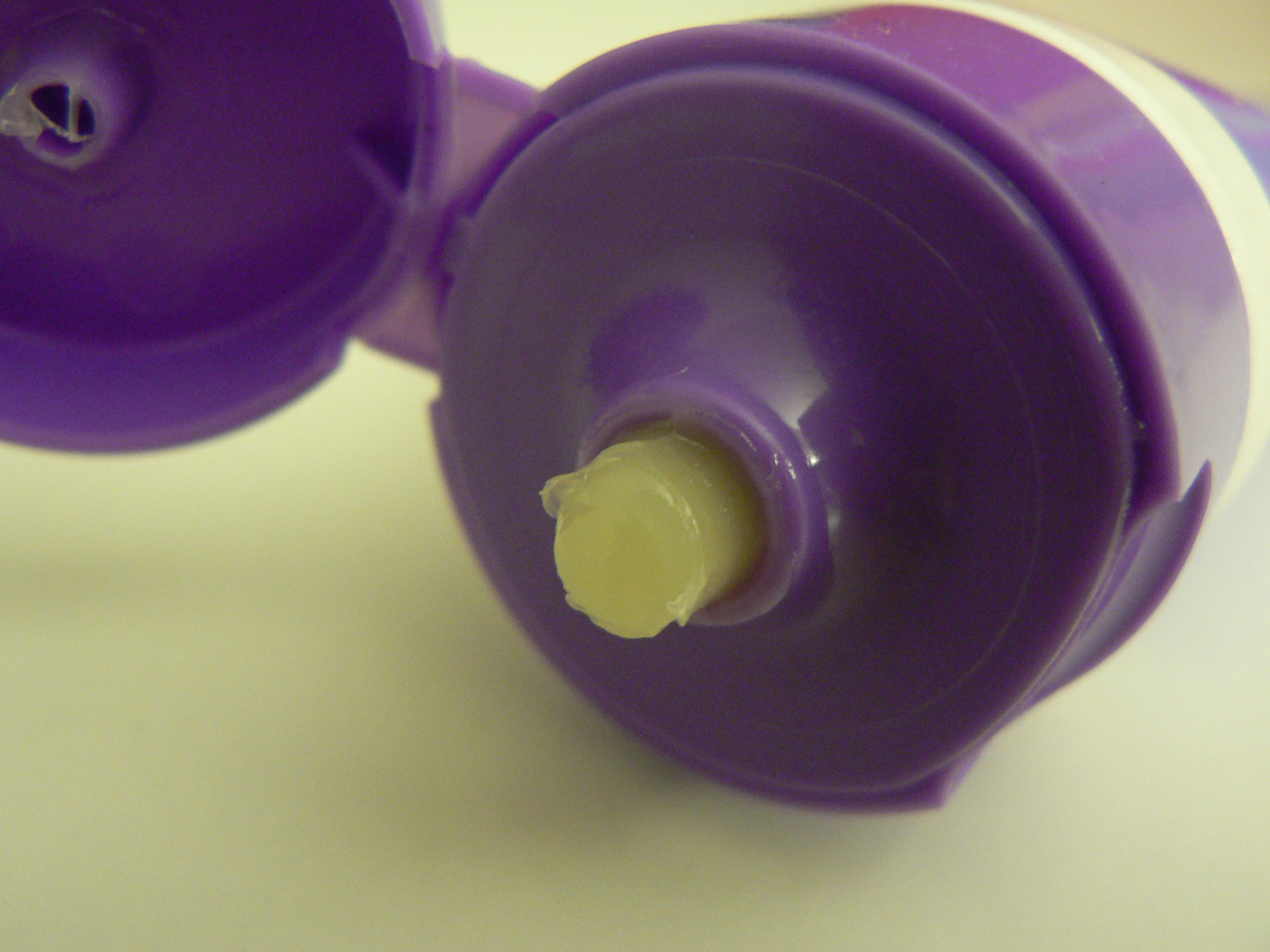
A photo of lanolin ointment. It is made up of hydrophilic polymers that can increase epithelial regrowth.

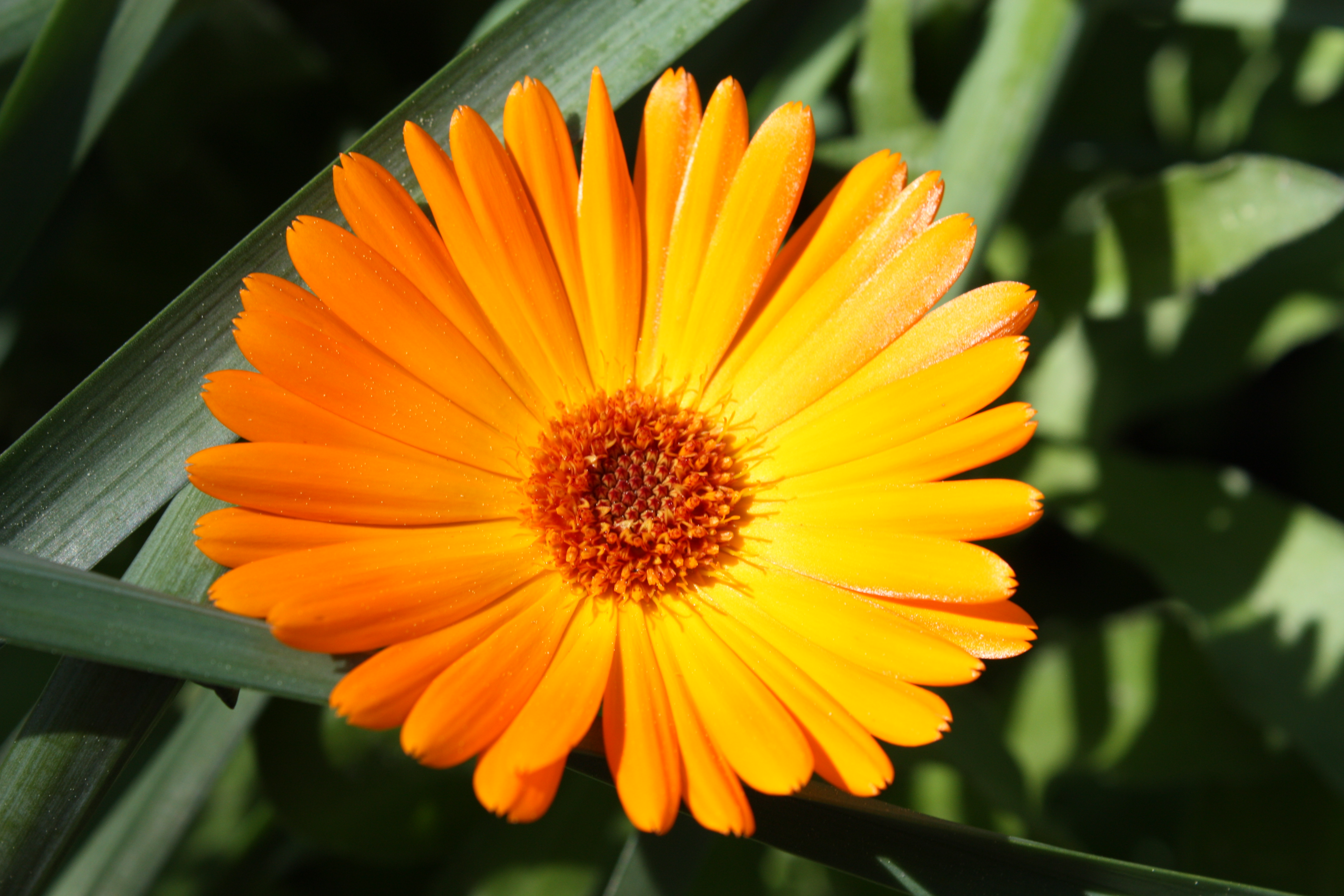
A photo of Calendula officinalis (marigold). It consists of saponins, flavonoids and terpenoid which show anti-inflammatory and healing properties to nipple fissure.

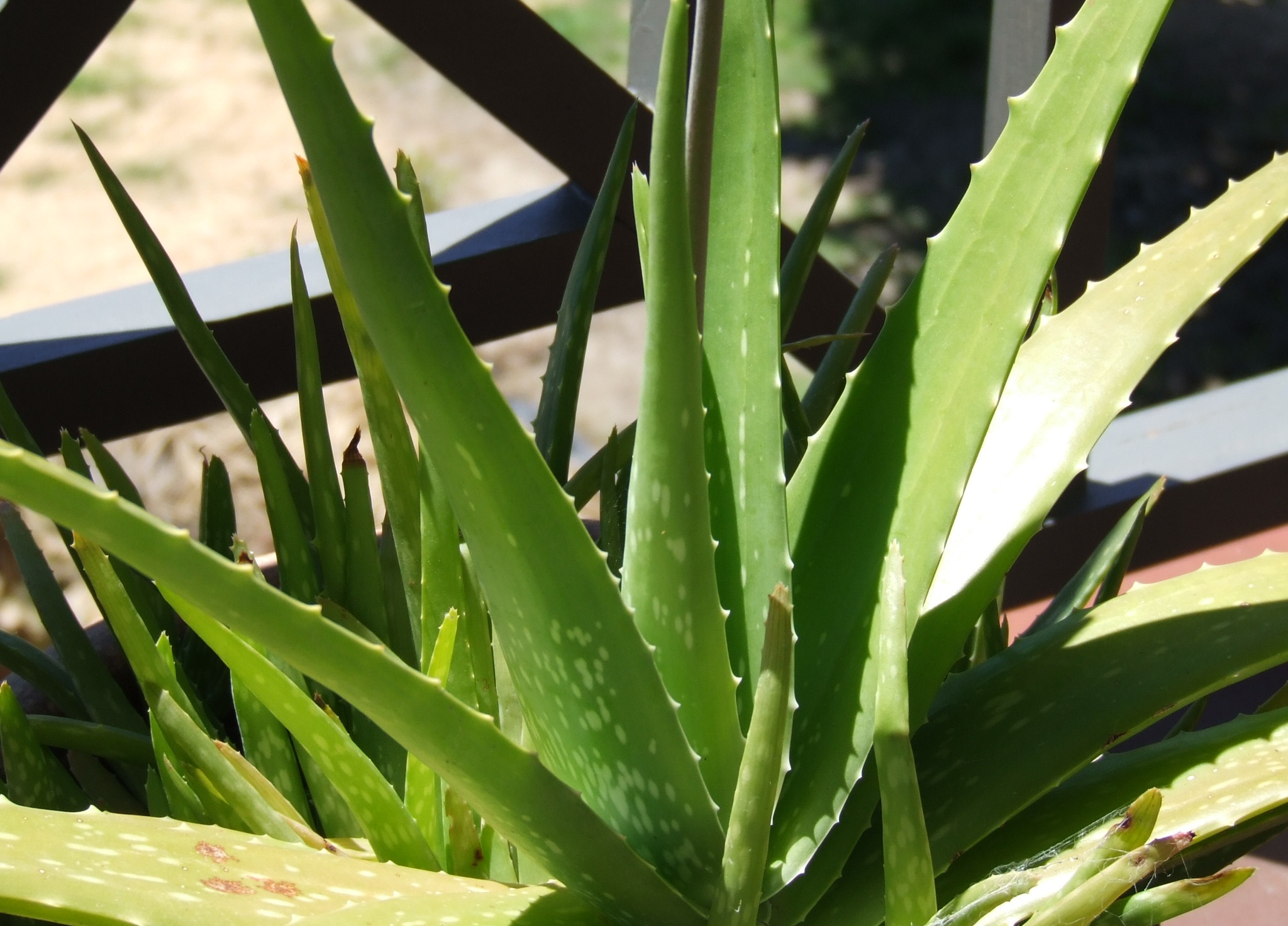
A photo of Aloe vera. It shows a significant anti-inflammatory effect on nipple fissure.

Drugs in treating nipple ache during breastfeeding can be divided into two categories based on the ways of administration: topical application and oral medication. The table below summarises the common medicine that can be taken by patients.

Table 1. Medicine for nipple pain during breastfeeding
Ways of administration	Form	Name	Effects
Topical application	Ointments	Hydrogel	Accelerates tissue regrowth by producing a cool, humid environment at the breast fissure wound
Topical application	Ointments	Lanolin (either with or without breast shells)	Soothes dry, itchy skin at the areola; Increases the epithelial-regrowth rate; Reduces exposure time to pain-related chemicals; Leads to inflammation of the skin
Topical application	Ointments	All-purpose nipple ointment (APNO)	Combination of antifungal and antibacterial agents; Reduces maternal perceptions of nipple pain
Topical application	Ointments	Antifungal agents E.g. Guaiac/Guaiazulene can effectively prevent breast fissure	Treats yeast infection by Candida
Topical application	Ointments	Antibiotics E.g. Mupirocin and kenacomb	Helps repair visible nipple trauma
Topical application	Ointments	Topical steroids E.g. Mometasone	Treats nipple eczema
Topical application	Ointments	Herbs E.g. Calendula officinalis (marigold), Ziziphus jujuba (Jujube), Aloe vera, Mentha spicata and Portulaca oleracea	Shows remarkable analgesic, anti-inflammatory and healing properties to fissuring; Prevents bacterial and fungus invasion
Oral medication	Pills	Antibacterial agents E.g. Dicloxacillin, cephalexin, penicillins, macrolides	Treats nipple fissure and decreases the risk of subsequent mastitis
Oral medication	Pills	Nifedipine	Treats Raynaud's phenomenon (vasospasm)

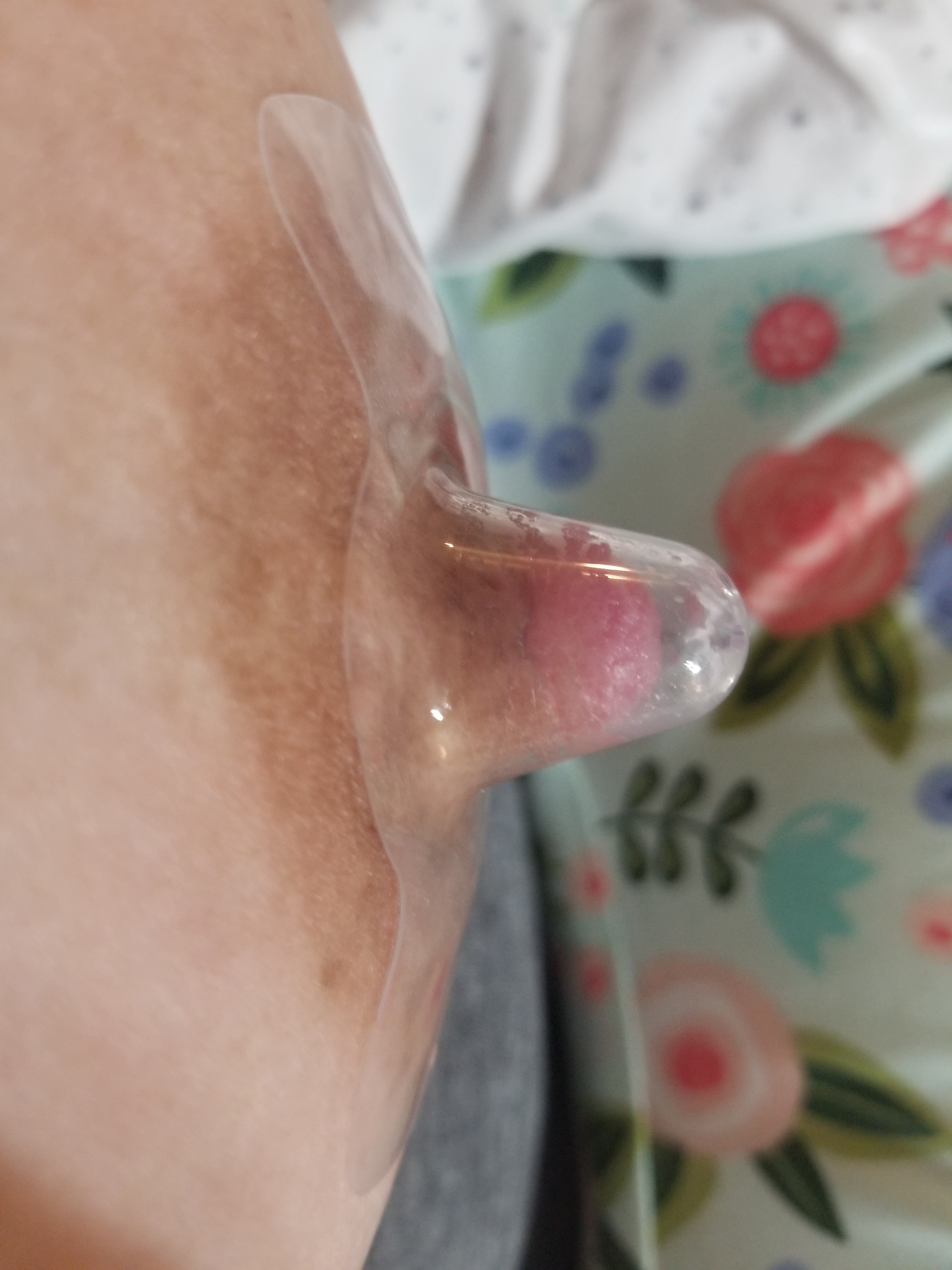
A nipple shield placed on the nipple to prevent bacterial invasion

=== Non-medication ===
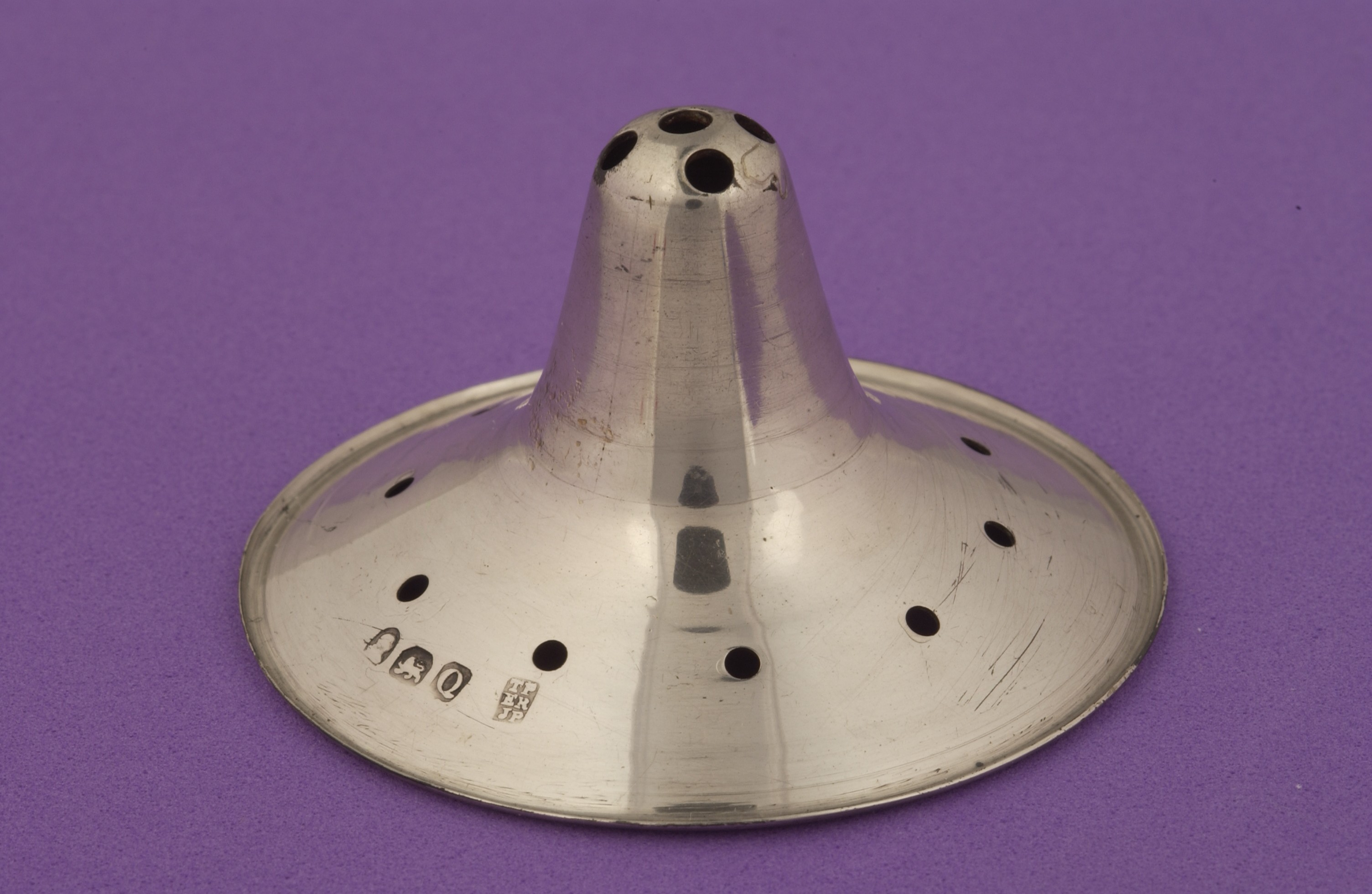
A photo of a silver cap. A silver cap blocks bacterial invasion and prevents nipple pain caused by bacterial infections.

There are three types of non-medical therapies, namely shielding by external protectors, light therapy and acupuncture. Bacterial invasion can be successfully blocked by external protectors of the nipple such as nipple shield, polyethylene film and silver cap, especially when the nipple is impaired by trauma. These protectors create a humid environment for wound recovery while defending it against bacterial infections. The silver cap consists of silver which is a natural agent with antibacterial properties. Hence it is also less likely to cause irritation. Light therapy including phototherapy and low-intensity laser therapy can treat nipple trauma as well. In the range of 630 to 1000 nm wavelength, light therapy facilitates wound recovery by promoting fibroblast proliferation, collagen synthesis, angiogenesis and growth factor production. Moreover, it can stimulate tissue regeneration, accelerate local blood flow rate through vasodilation, suppress inflammation, increase fissure healing rate, and reduce pain sensation. Recently, many review articles have suggested the effectiveness of acupuncture in treating nipple pain as it showed considerable improvement in treating breast engorgement. A 2016 Cochrane review found that a number of interventions were somewhat effective, such as hot/cold packs, Gua-Sha (scraping therapy), cabbage leaves, and proteolytic enzymes but none of the evidence supported widespread implementation.

=== Surgery ===
A minimally invasive surgical therapy called serial ultrasound-guided aspiration can be performed to treat breast mastitis in an outpatient setting, achieving a better cosmetic postoperative recovery. On the other side, nipple pain caused by tongue-tie can seek a surgical therapy called frenotomy on infants. In this surgery, the frenulum under the tongue will be clipped to improve latch and remove the restriction of tongue movement. Hence, breastfeeding efficiency can be improved. However, it may not instantly relieve nipple pain since infants probably have developed uncommon tongue movements.

== Prevention ==
Early and effective breastfeeding can minimize the likelihood of engorgement, latch difficulties, nipple trauma and bacterial infections. The surface of the nipple and breast pumps should be sterilized to remove sources of irritants before breastfeeding or pumping of milk. It may help prevent yeast infections and cross-contamination of bacteria between family members. Ideally, cleaning baby items and mothers' underwear like boiling or disinfecting pacifiers, diapers, bras and bathing equipment frequently can prevent infections. During breastfeeding, mothers should hold infants in the correct breastfeeding position in order to prevent nipple pain brought by poor positioning.

== Social and cultural implications ==
Nipple pain during breastfeeding may affect the family life of mothers. On average, mothers and infants need to make 36 visits to healthcare providers for nipple pain in their first year, leading to a huge household expense. Meanwhile, mothers may shorten breastfeeding duration and switch to artificial infant milk in order to prevent suffering from the pain. Besides, the painful experience may affect the relationship between parents and children as mothers may develop depression, tension and mood disturbances during breastfeeding.
