= Nipple =

Part of the breast

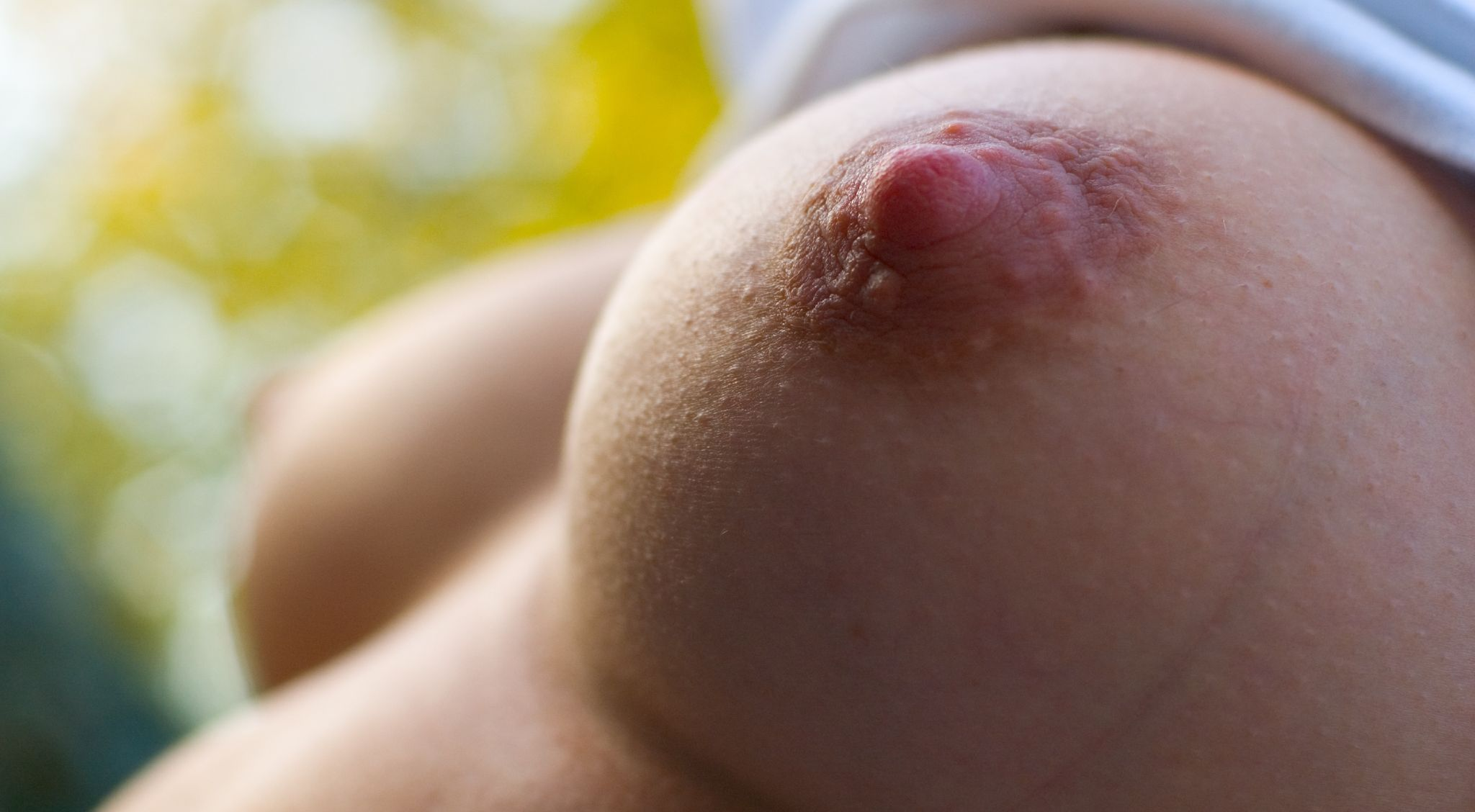
- Nipple, areola and breast of a pregnant woman

Details
- Part of: Breast

Identifiers
- Latin: papilla mammaria
- MeSH: D009558
- TA98: A16.0.02.004
- TA2: 7105
- FMA: 67771

The nipple is a raised region of tissue on the surface of the breast from which, in lactating females, milk from the mammary gland leaves the body through the lactiferous ducts to nurse an infant. The milk can flow through the nipple passively, or it can be ejected by smooth muscle contractions that occur along with the ductal system. The nipple is surrounded by the areola, which is often a darker colour than the surrounding skin.

When referring to non-humans, the female nipple is often called a teat. "Nipple" or "teat" can also be used to describe the flexible mouthpiece of a baby bottle. Male mammals also have nipples, but without the same level of function or prominence.

In humans, the nipples of both females and males can be sexually stimulated as part of sexual arousal. In many cultures, female nipples are sexualized, or regarded as sex objects and evaluated in terms of their physical characteristics and sex appeal. As such, there are often mores for their coverage.

== Etymology ==
The word nipple most likely originates as a diminutive of neb, an Old English word of Germanic origin meaning "beak", "nose", or "face". The words teat and tit share a Germanic ancestor. The latter, tit, was inherited directly from Proto-Germanic, while the first entered English via Old French.

== Structure ==
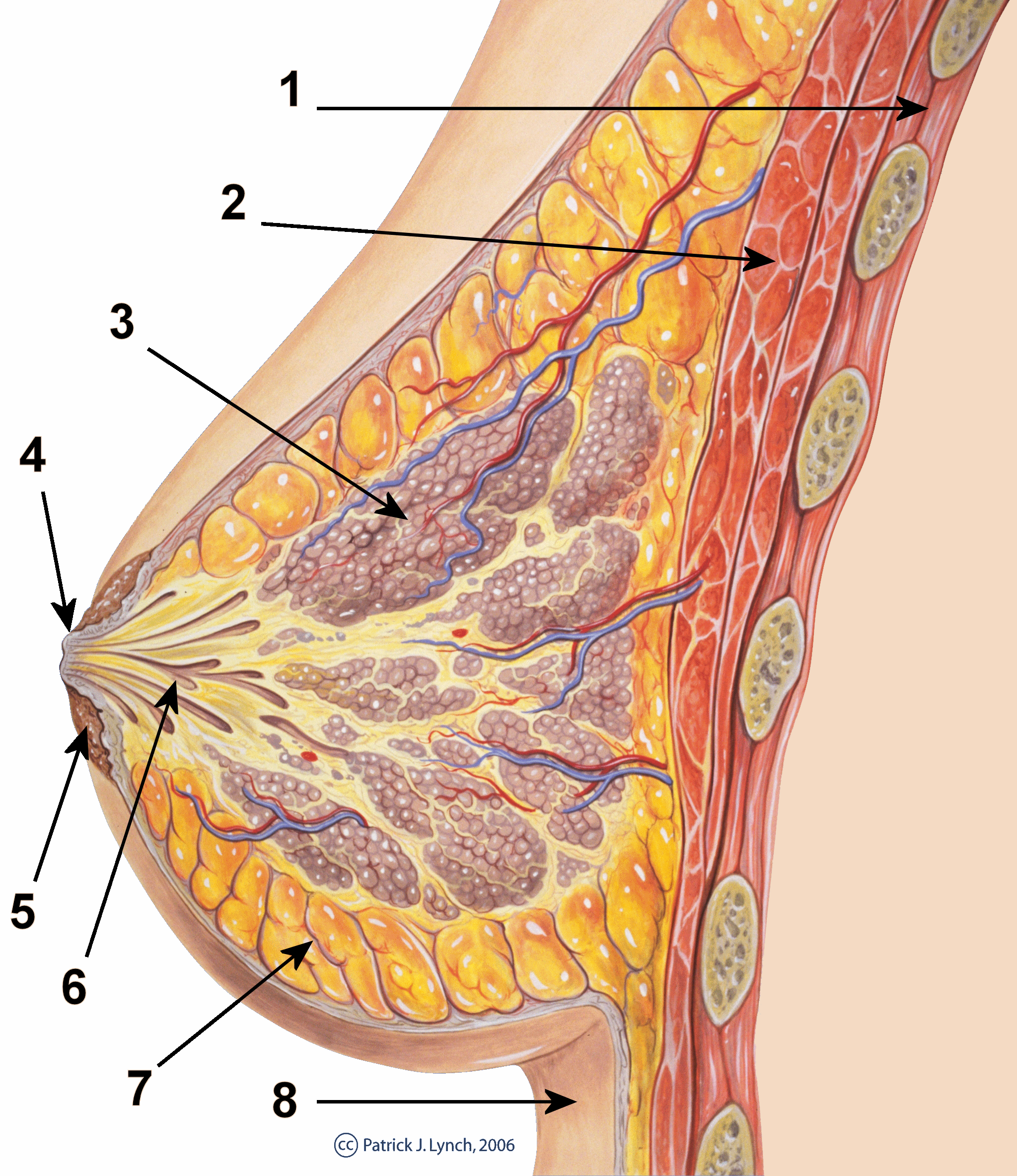
The breast: cross-section scheme of the mammary gland: 1. Chest wall; 2. Pectoralis muscles; 3. Lobules; 4. Nipple; 5. Areola; 6. Milk duct; 7. Fatty tissue; 8. Skin

In mammals, a nipple (also called a mammary papilla or teat) is a small projection of skin containing the outlets for 15–20 lactiferous ducts arranged cylindrically around the tip. Marsupials and eutherian mammals typically have an even number of nipples arranged bilaterally, from as few as 2 to as many as 19.

The skin of the nipple is rich in a supply of special nerves that are sensitive to certain stimuli: these are slowly-adapting and rapidly-adapting cutaneous mechanoreceptors. Mechanoreceptors are identified respectively by Type I slowly-adapting with multiple Merkel corpuscle end-organs and Type II slowly-adapting with single Ruffini corpuscle end-organs, as well as Type I rapidly-adapting with multiple Meissner corpuscle end-organs and Type II rapidly-adapting with single Pacinian corpuscle end-organs. The dominant nerve supply to the nipple comes from the lateral cutaneous branches of fourth intercostal nerve. The nipple is also used as an anatomical landmark. It marks the T4 (fourth thoracic vertebra) dermatome and rests over the approximate level of the diaphragm.

The arterial supply to the nipple and breast originates from the anterior intercostal branches of the internal thoracic (mammary) arteries; lateral thoracic artery; and thoracodorsal arteries. The venous vessels parallel the arteries. The lymphatic ducts that drain the nipple are the same for the breast. The axillary nodes are the apical axillary nodes, the lateral group and the anterior group. 75% of the lymph is drained through the axillary lymph nodes located near the armpit. The rest of the drainage leaves the nipple and breast through infroclavicular, pectoral, or parasternal nodes.

=== In male mammals ===
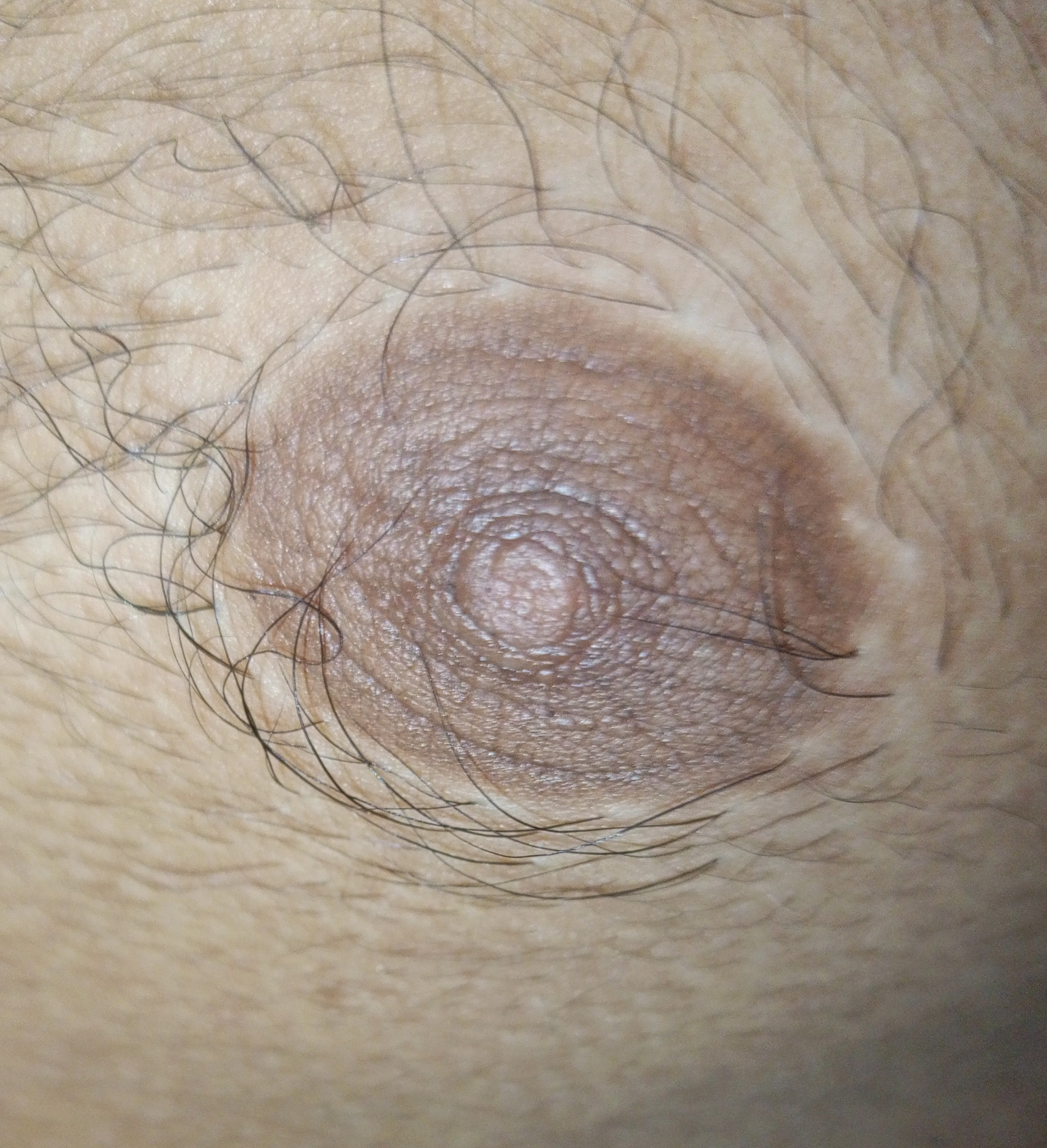
Nipple of a human male

Almost all mammals have nipples. Why males have nipples has been the subject of scientific research. Differences among the sexes (called sexual dimorphism) within a given species are considered by evolutionary biologists to be mostly the result of sexual selection, directly or indirectly. There is a consensus that the male nipple exists because there is no particular advantage to males losing the trait. In consequence, some biologists would call the male nipple a spandrel.

In humans, the nipples are often surrounded by body hair.

== Function ==
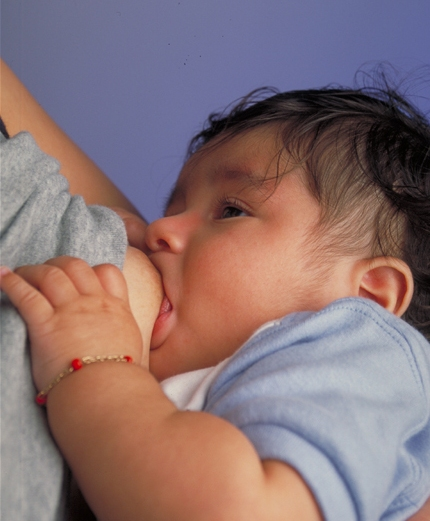
Infant latched on to a nipple to breastfeed

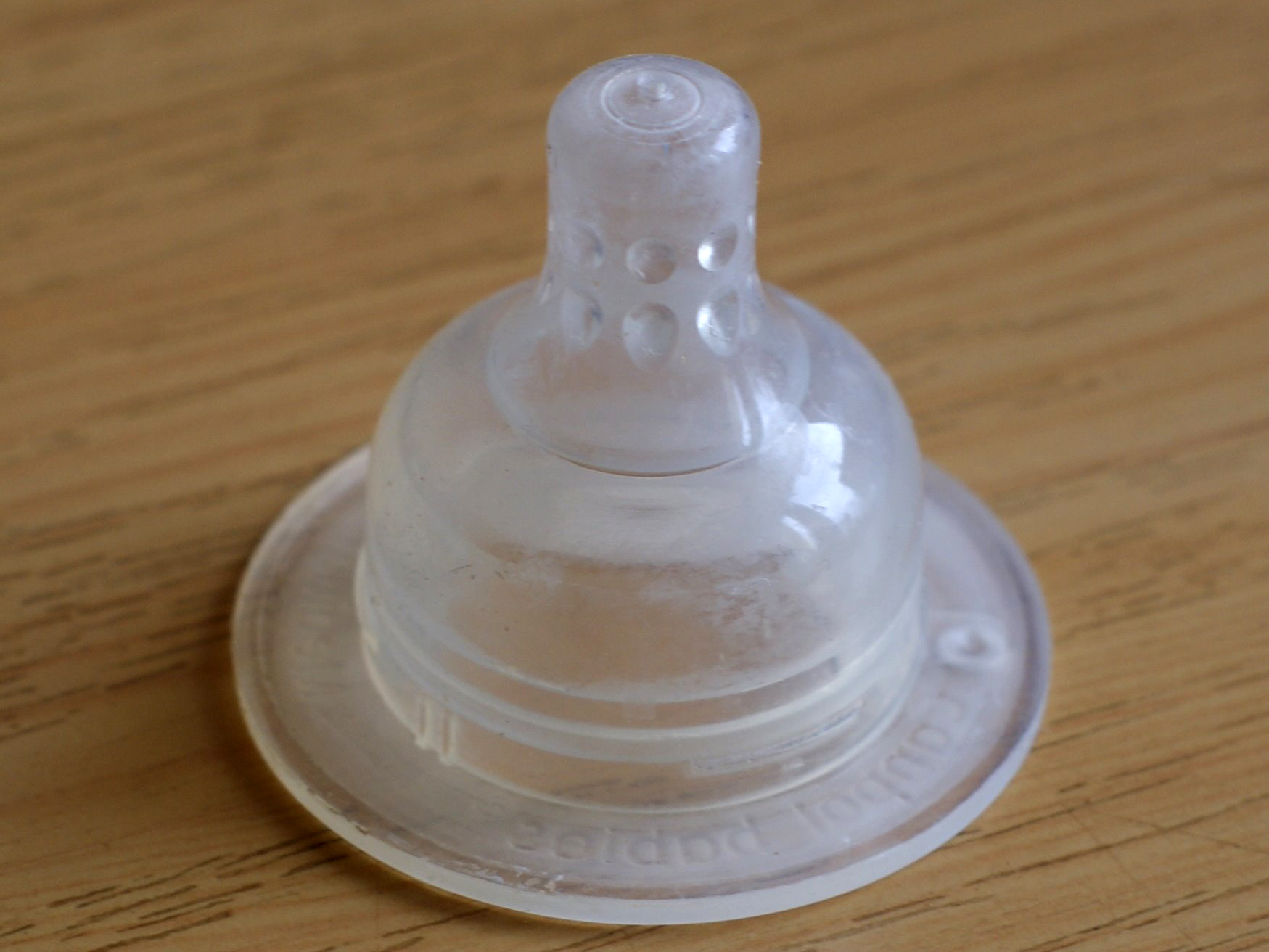
Silicone teat, or nipple, used for bottle feeding

The physiological purpose of nipples is to deliver milk, produced in the female mammary glands during lactation, to an infant. During breastfeeding, nipple stimulation by an infant will stimulate the release of oxytocin from the hypothalamus. Oxytocin is a hormone that increases during pregnancy and acts on the breast to help produce the milk-ejection reflex. Oxytocin release from the nipple stimulation of the infant causes the uterus to contract even after childbirth. The strong uterine contractions that are caused by the stimulation of the mother's nipples help the uterus contract to clamp down the uterine arteries. These contractions are necessary to prevent post-partum haemorrhage.

When the infant suckles or stimulates the nipple, oxytocin levels rise and small muscles in the breast contract, moving the milk through the milk ducts. The result of nipple stimulation by the infant helps to move breast milk out through the ducts and to the nipple. This contraction of milk is called the "let-down reflex". Latching on refers to the infant fastening onto the nipple to breastfeed. A good attachment is when the bottom of the areola (the area around the nipple) is in the infant's mouth and the nipple is drawn back inside his or her mouth. A poor latch results in insufficient nipple stimulation to create the let down reflex. The nipple is poorly stimulated when the baby latches on too close to the tip of the nipple. This poor attachment can cause sore and cracked nipples and a reluctance of the mother to continue to breastfeed. After birth, the milk supply increases based upon the continuous and increasing stimulation of the nipple by the infant. If the baby increases nursing time at the nipple, the mammary glands respond to this stimulation by increasing milk production.

The nipple becomes erect in response to various stimuli, including sexual arousal, cold temperatures, stress, and fear.

== Clinical significance ==
=== Pain ===
Nipple pain can be a disincentive for breastfeeding. Sore nipples that progress to cracked nipples is of concern since many women cease breastfeeding due to the pain. In some instances, an ulcer will form on the nipple. One reason for the development of cracked and sore nipples is the incorrect latching-on of the infant to the nipple. If a nipple appears to be wedge-shaped, white and flattened, this may indicate that the attachment of the infant is not good and there is a potential of developing cracked nipples. Herpes infection of the nipple is painful. Nipple pain can also be caused by excessive friction of clothing against the nipple that causes a fissure.

=== Discharge ===
Nipple discharge refers to any fluid that seeps out of the nipple of the breast. Discharge from the nipple does not occur in lactating women. And discharge in non-pregnant women or women who are not breastfeeding may not cause concern. Men that have discharge from their nipples are not typical. Discharge from the nipples of men or boys may indicate a problem. Discharge from the nipples can appear without squeezing or may only be noticeable if the nipples are squeezed. One nipple can have discharge while the other does not. The discharge can be clear, green, bloody, brown or straw-coloured. The consistency can be thick, thin, sticky or watery.

Some cases of nipple discharge will clear on their own without treatment. Nipple discharge is most often not cancer (benign), but rarely, it can be a sign of breast cancer. It is important to determine what is causing the discharge and to get treatment. Reasons for nipple discharge include:

- Pregnancy
- Recent breastfeeding
- Rubbing on the area from a bra or T-shirt
- Injury to the breast
- Infection
- Inflammation and clogging of the breast ducts
- Noncancerous pituitary tumors
- Small growth in the breast (usually not cancer)
- Severe underactive thyroid gland (hypothyroidism)
- Fibrocystic breast (normal lumpiness in the breast)
- Use of certain medicines
- Use of certain herbs, such as anise and fennel
- Widening of the milk ducts

A bleeding nipple requires investigation, as there are cancers associated with bloody nipple discharge. The causes determined in further investigation, however, are most often benign (noncancerous), the most common cause being a benign intraductal papilloma. Other possible causes include trauma from breastfeeding or piercings, chafing, mastitis, duct ectasia, dermatitis and Paget's disease.

Other nipple discharge that is not normal comes from only one nipple, or comes out on its own without squeezing or touching the nipple. Nipple discharge is more likely to be normal if it comes out of both nipples or happens when the nipples are squeezed. Squeezing the nipple to check for discharge can make it worse. Leaving the nipple alone may make the discharge stop.

Sometimes, babies can have nipple discharge. This is caused by hormones from the mother before birth. It usually goes away in two weeks. Cancers such as Paget's disease (a rare type of cancer involving the skin of the nipple) can also cause nipple discharge.

Nipple discharge in a male is a matter of concern. Most of the time a mammogram and an examination of the fluid is done. A biopsy is often performed. A fine needle aspiration (FNA) biopsy can be fast and least painful. A very thin, hollow needle and slight suction will be used to remove a small sample from under the nipple. Using a local anesthetic to numb the skin may not be necessary since a thin needle is used for the biopsy. Receiving an injection to prevent pain from the biopsy may be more painful than the biopsy itself.

Some men develop a condition known as gynecomastia, in which the breast tissue under the nipple develops and grows. Discharge from the nipple can occur. The nipple may swell in some men possibly due to increased levels of estrogen.

=== Appearance ===
Prior to puberty, the nipples of girls are very similar to those of boys.

Changes in appearance may be normal or related to disease.

- Inverted nipples – This is normal if the nipples have always been indented inward and can easily point out when touched. If the nipples are pointing in and this is new, this is an unexpected change.
- Skin puckering of the nipple – This can be caused by scar tissue from surgery or an infection. Often, scar tissue forms for no reason. Most of the time this issue does not need treatment. This is an unexpected change. This change can be of concern since puckering or retraction of the nipple can indicate an underlying change in breast tissue that may be cancerous.
- The nipple is warm to the touch, red or painful – This can be an infection. It is rarely due to breast cancer.
- Scaly, flaking, or itchy nipple – This is most often due to eczema or a bacterial or fungal infection. This change is not expected. Flaking, scaly, or itchy nipples can be a sign of Paget's disease.
- Thickened skin with large pores – This is called peau d'orange because the skin looks like an orange peel. An infection in the breast or inflammatory breast cancer can cause this problem. This is not an expected change.
- Retracted nipples – The nipple was raised above the surface but changes, begins to pull inward, and does not come out when stimulated.

The average projection and size of human female nipples is slightly more than 3/8 inch (9.5 mm).

=== Breast cancer ===
Symptoms of breast cancer can often be seen first by changes of the nipple and areola, although not all women have the same symptoms, and some people do not have any signs or symptoms at all. A person may find out they have breast cancer after a routine mammogram. Warning signs can include:

- New lump in the nipple, or breast or armpit
- Thickening or swelling of part of the breast, areola, or nipple
- Irritation or dimpling of breast skin
- Redness or flaky skin in the nipple area or the breast
- Pulling in of the nipple or pain in the nipple area
- Nipple discharge other than breast milk, including blood
- Any change in the size or the shape of the breast or nipple
- Pain in any area of the breast

Changes in the nipple are not necessarily symptoms or signs of breast cancer. Other conditions of the nipple can mimic the signs and symptoms of breast cancer.

=== Vertical transmission ===
Some infections are transmitted through the nipple, especially if irritation or injury to the nipple has occurred. In these circumstances, the nipple itself can become infected with Candida that is present in the mouth of the breastfeeding infant. The infant will transmit the infection to the mother. Most of the time, this infection is localized to the area of the nipple. In some cases, the infection can progress to become a full-blown case of mastitis or breast infection. In some cases, if the mother has an infection with no nipple cracks or ulcerations, it is still safe to breastfeed the infant.

Herpes infection of the nipple can go unnoticed because the lesions are small, but they are usually quite painful. Herpes in the newborn is a serious and sometimes fatal infection. Transmission of Hepatitis C and B to the infant can occur if the nipples are cracked.

Other pathogens can be transmitted through a break of the skin of the nipple and can infect the infant.

=== Other disorders ===
- Nipple bleb
- Candida infection of the nipple
- Eczema of the nipple
- Inverted nipple
- Staphylococcus infection of the nipple
- Edematous areola
- Herpes infection of the nipple
- Reynaud phenomenon of the nipple
- Flat nipple

=== Surgery ===
A nipple-sparing/subcutaneous mastectomy is a surgical procedure where breast tissue is removed, but the nipple and areola are preserved. This procedure was historically done only prophylactically or with mastectomy for the benign disease over the fear of increased cancer development in retained areolar ductal tissue. Recent series suggest that it may be an oncologically sound procedure for tumours not in the subareolar position.

== Society and culture ==
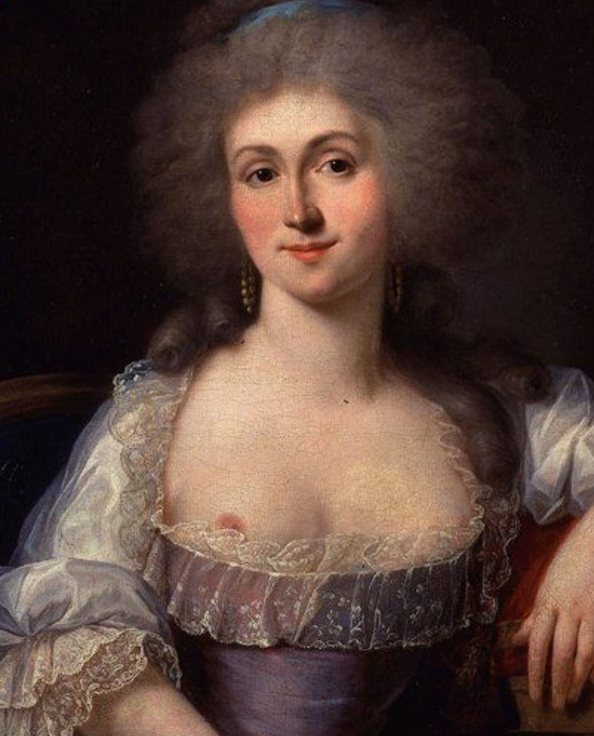
Duplessis's portrait of Marie Thérèse Louise of Savoy baring a nipple dates from 18th-century France.

=== Exposure ===
The cultural tendency to hide the female nipple under clothing has existed in Western culture since the 1800s. As female nipples are often perceived an intimate part, covering them might have originated under Victorian morality, as with riding side saddle. Exposing the entire breast and nipple is a form of protest for some and a crime for others. The exposure of nipples is usually considered immodest and in some instances is viewed as lewd or indecent behavior.

A case in Erie, Pennsylvania, concerning the exposure of breasts and nipple proceeded to the United States Supreme Court. The Erie ordinance was regulating the nipple in public as an act that is committed when a person "knowingly or intentionally, ... appears in a state of nudity commits Public Indecency." Later in the statute, nudity is further described as an uncovered female nipple. But nipple exposure of a man was not regulated. An opinion column credited to Cecil Adams noted: "Ponder the significance of that. A man walks around bare-chested and the worst that happens is he won't get served in restaurants. But a woman who goes topless is legally in the same boat as if she'd had sex in public. That may seem crazy, but in the US it's a permissible law."

The legality around the exposure of nipples is inconsistently regulated throughout the US. Some states do not allow the visualization of any part of the breast. Other jurisdictions prohibit any female chest anatomy by banning anatomical structures that lie below the top of the areola or nipple. Such is the case in West Virginia and Massachusetts. West Virginia's regulation is very specific and is not likely to be misinterpreted, stating: "[The] display of 'any portion of the cleavage of the human female breast exhibited by a dress, blouse, skirt, leotard, bathing suit, or other wearing apparel [is permitted] provided the areola is not exposed, in whole or in part.'"

The social media site Instagram has a "no nipples" policy with exceptions: material that is not allowed includes "some photos of female nipples, but photos of post-mastectomy scarring and women actively breastfeeding are allowed. Nudity in photos of paintings and sculptures is OK, too". Previously, Instagram had removed images of nursing mothers. Instagram removed images of Rihanna and had her account cancelled in 2014 when she posted selfies with nipples. This was incentive for the Twitter campaign #FreeTheNipple. In 2016, the Instagram page @genderless_nipples invited users to post images of nipples from both sexes, displaying close-ups of the nipples of both men and women for the purpose of spotlighting what may be inconsistency. Some contributors have circumvented the policy. Facebook has also been struggling to define its nipple policy.

Filmmaker Lina Esco made a film entitled Free the Nipple, which is about "laws against female toplessness or restrictions on images of female, but not male, nipples", which Esco states is an example of sexism in society.

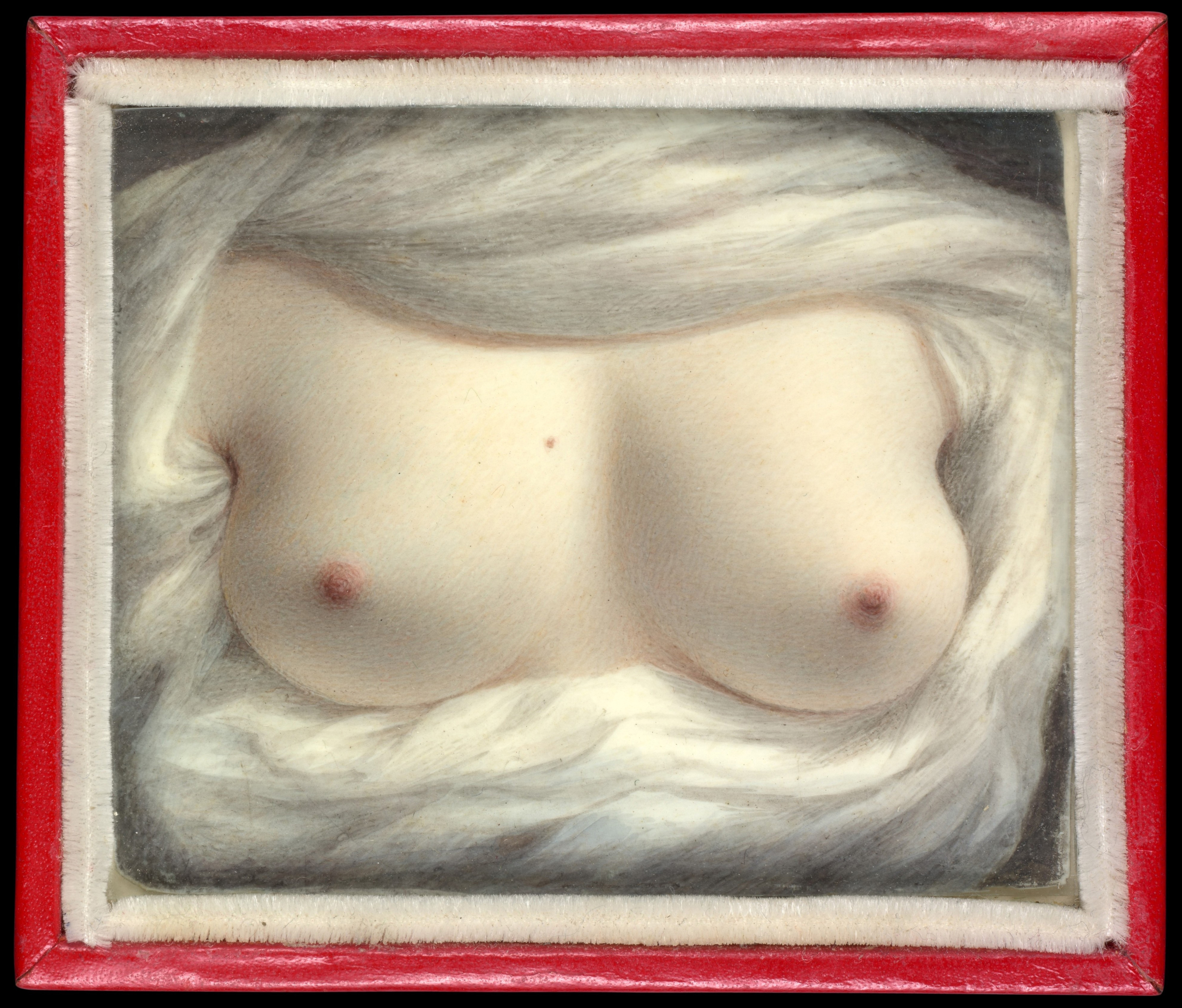
Beauty Revealed, 1828 self-portrait by the American artist Sarah Goodridge.

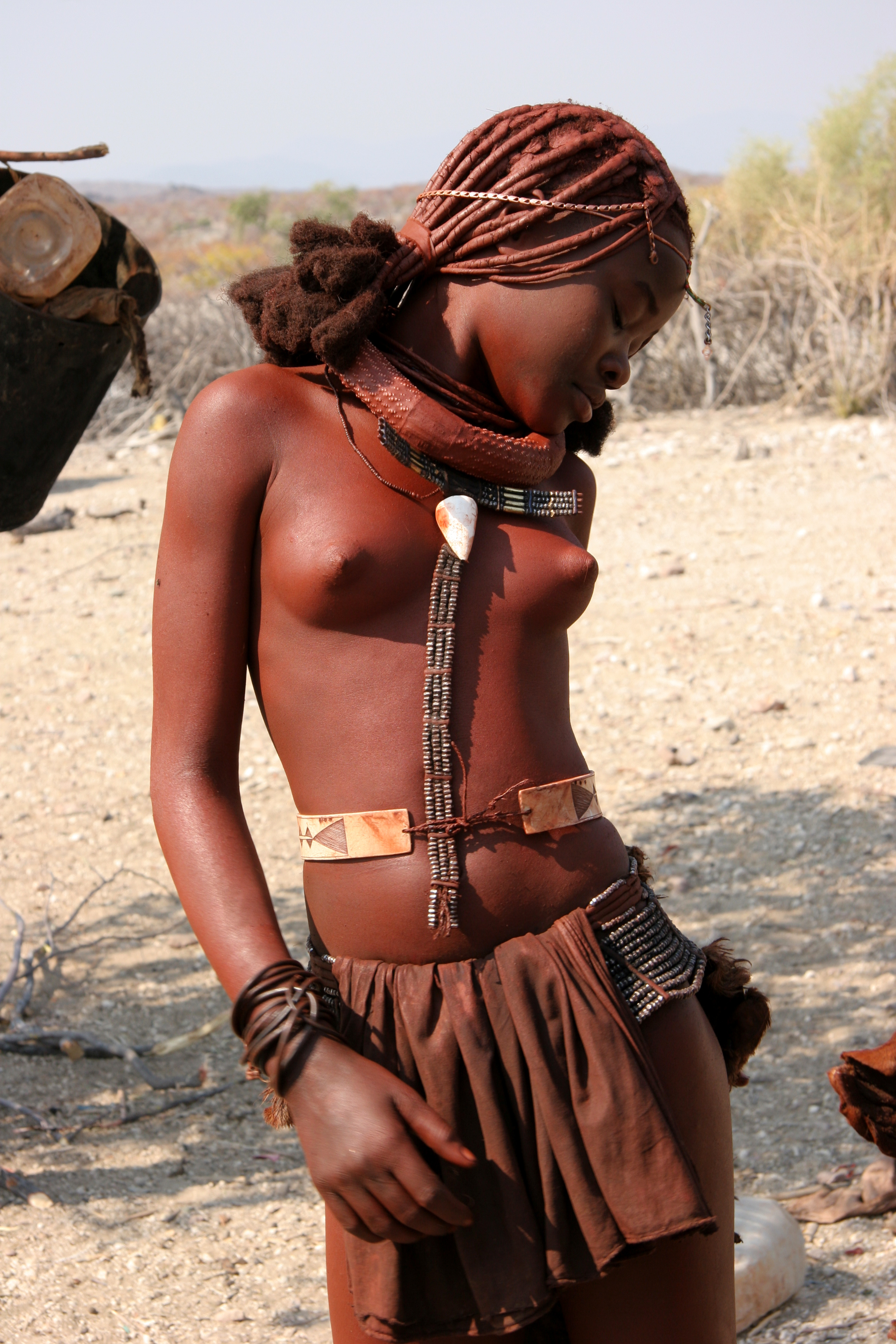
A Namibian woman going topless

=== Sexuality ===
Nipples can be sensitive to touch, and nipple stimulation can incite sexual arousal. Few women report experiencing orgasm from nipple stimulation. Before Komisaruk et al.'s functional magnetic resonance (fMRI) research on nipple stimulation in 2011, reports of women achieving orgasm from nipple stimulation relied solely on anecdotal evidence. Komisaruk's study was the first to map the female genitals onto the sensory portion of the brain; it indicates that sensation from the nipples travels to the same part of the brain as sensations from the vagina, clitoris and cervix, and that these reported orgasms are genital orgasms caused by nipple stimulation, and may be directly linked to the genital sensory cortex ("the genital area of the brain").

=== Piercings ===
A nipple piercing is a type of body piercing, centered usually at the base of the nipple. It can be pierced at any angle but is usually done horizontally or, less often, vertically. It is also possible to place multiple piercings on top of one another.

=== In business ===
Some companies and non-profit organisations have used the word nipple or images of nipples to draw attention to their product or cause.

== See also ==
- Breast milk
- Fleischer's syndrome
- Nipple prosthesis for breast cancer survivors
- Pasties
- Super Bowl XXXVIII halftime show controversy
- Supernumerary (third) nipple
- Udder
- Wardrobe malfunction
