= Sugar tit =

Type of baby pacifier

Sugar tit is a folk name for a baby pacifier, or dummy, that was once commonly made and used in North America and Britain. It was made by placing a spoonful of sugar, or honey, in a small patch of clean cloth, then gathering the cloth around the sugar and twisting it to form a bulb. The bulb was then secured by twine or a rubber band. The baby's saliva would slowly dissolve the sugar in the bulb.

In use the exposed outfolded fabric could give the appearance of a flower in the baby's mouth. David Ransel quotes a Russian study by Dr. N. E. Kushev while discussing a similar home-made cloth-and-food pacifier called a soska (со́ска); there, the term "flower", as used colloquially by mothers, refers to a bloom of mold in the child's mouth caused by decay of the contents.

As early as 1802 a German physician, Christian Struve, described the sugar tit as "one of the most revolting customs".
