= Bleb (medicine) =

Blister-like protrusion filled with serous fluid

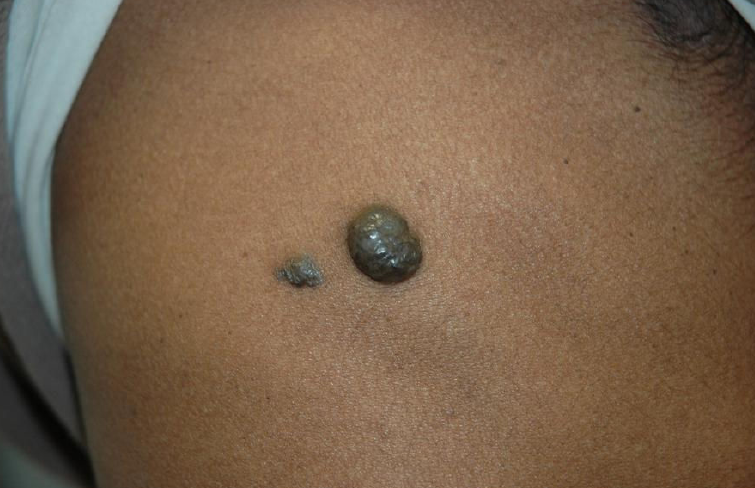
- Blue rubber bleb nevus syndrome

In medicine, a bleb is a blister-like protrusion (often hemispherical) or vesicle filled with serous fluid. Blebs can form in a number of tissues by different pathologies, including frostbite and can "appear and disappear within a short time interval".

In pathology, pulmonary blebs are small subpleural thin-walled air-containing spaces, not larger than 1-2 cm in diameter, found by the upper lobe of the lung, between the lung and the visceral pleura. Their walls are thin, being less than 1 mm thick. If they rupture, they allow air to escape into pleural space, resulting in a spontaneous pneumothorax and possibly a collapsed lung. Blebs can grow larger or join together to create a larger cyst, or bulla. There are usually no symptoms unless a pneumothorax occurs or the bulla grows very large. Blebs are usually associated with emphysema.

In ophthalmology, blebs may be formed intentionally in the treatment of glaucoma. In such treatments, functional blebs facilitate the circulation of aqueous humor, the blockage of which will lead to increase in eye pressure. Use of collagen matrix wound modulation device such as ologen during glaucoma surgery is known to produce vascular and functional blebs, which are positively correlated with treatment success rate.

In breasts, a bleb is a milk blister (also known as blocked nipple pore, nipple blister, or "milk under the skin").
