= Pacifier =

Rubber, plastic or silicone nipple for infants or toddlers to suck upon

Pacifier types

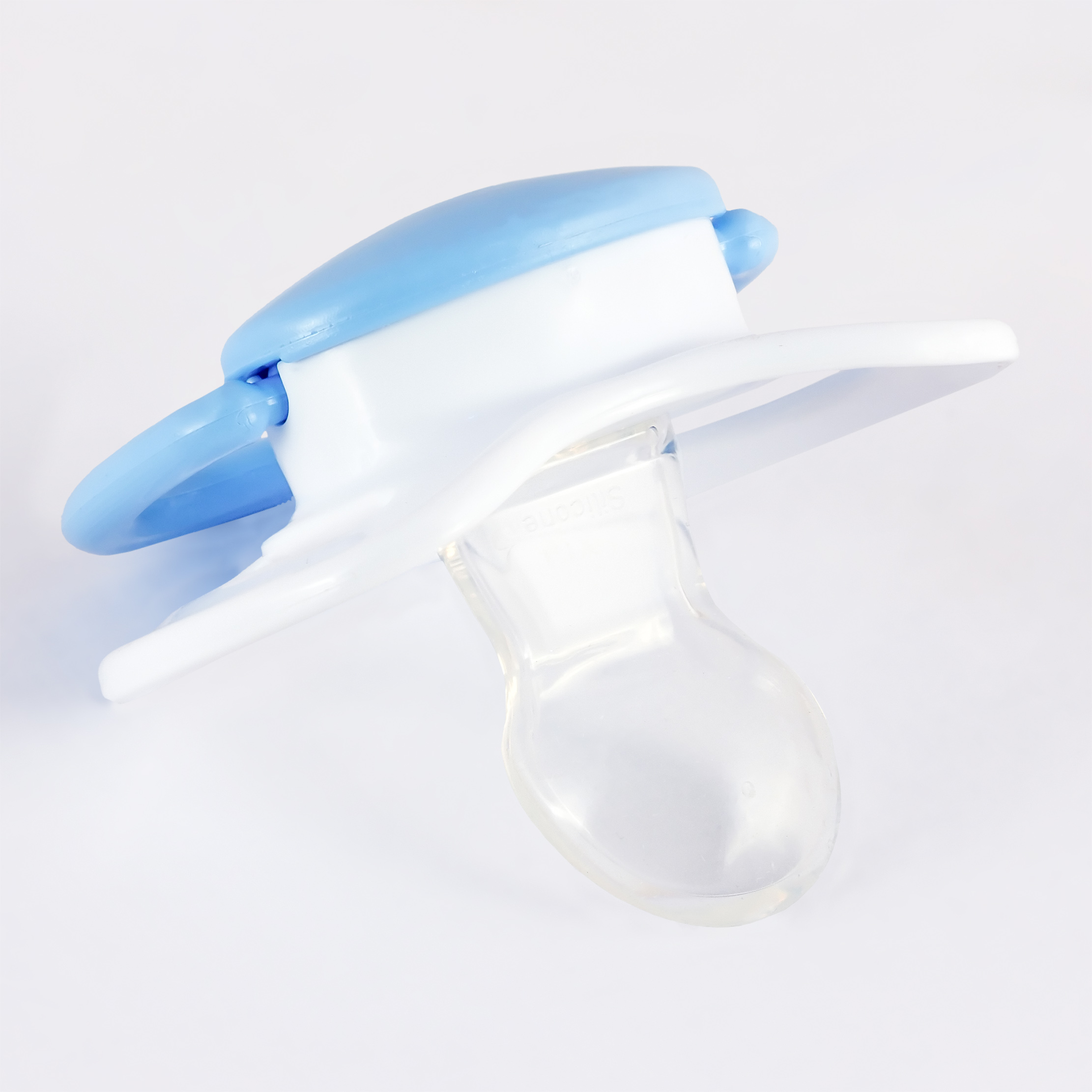
Multiple piece pacifier (blue)

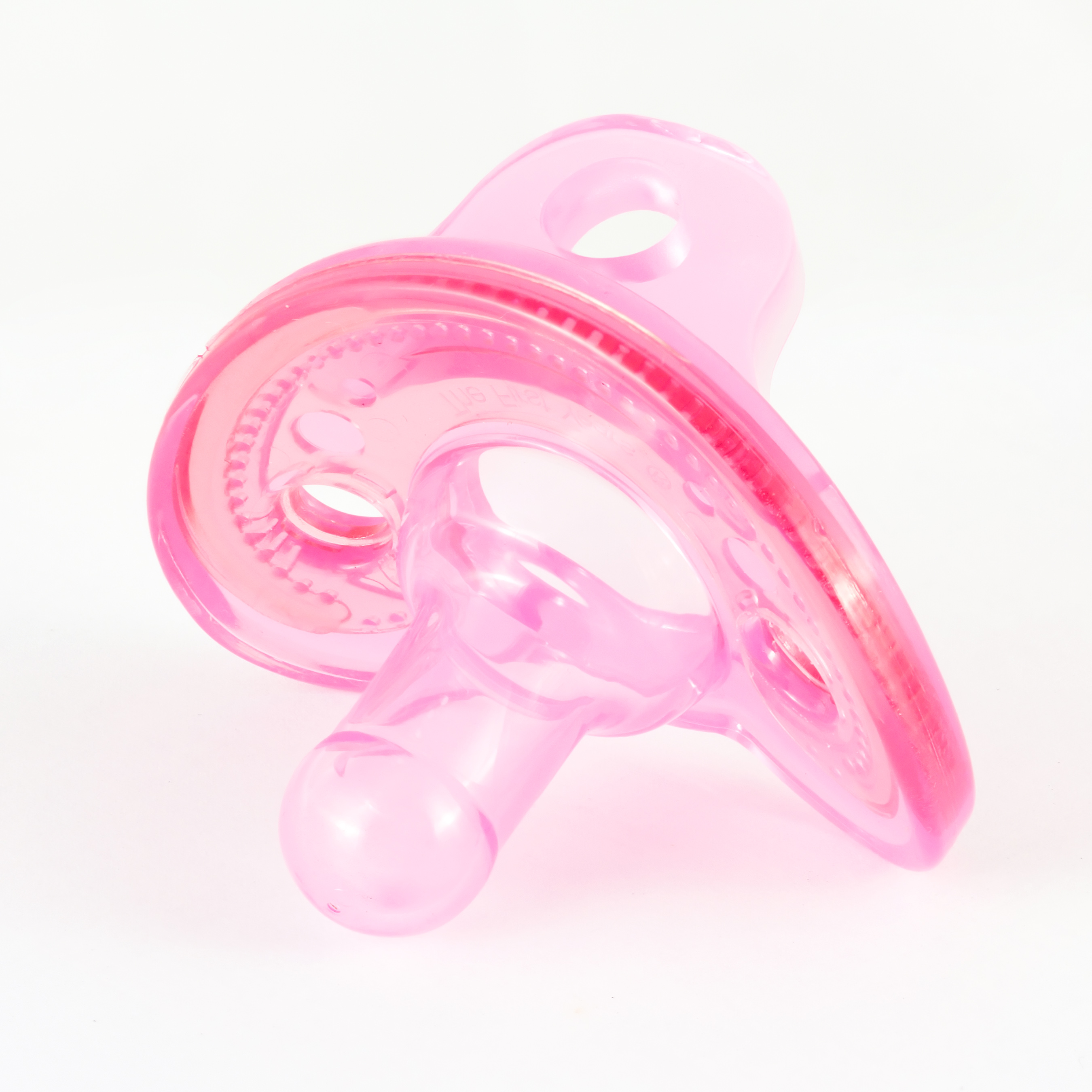
Single piece pacifier (pink)

A pacifier is a rubber, plastic, or silicone nipple substitute given to an infant and toddler to suckle on between feedings to quiet their distress by satisfying the need to suck when they do not need to eat. Pacifiers normally have three parts: an elongated teat, a handle, and a mouth shield that prevents the child from swallowing or choking on it.

Pacifiers have many informal names: binky or nookie (American English), dummy (Australian and British English, in which it is standard), dokey (informal Scots), soother (Canadian English), and dodie (Hiberno-English).

== History ==
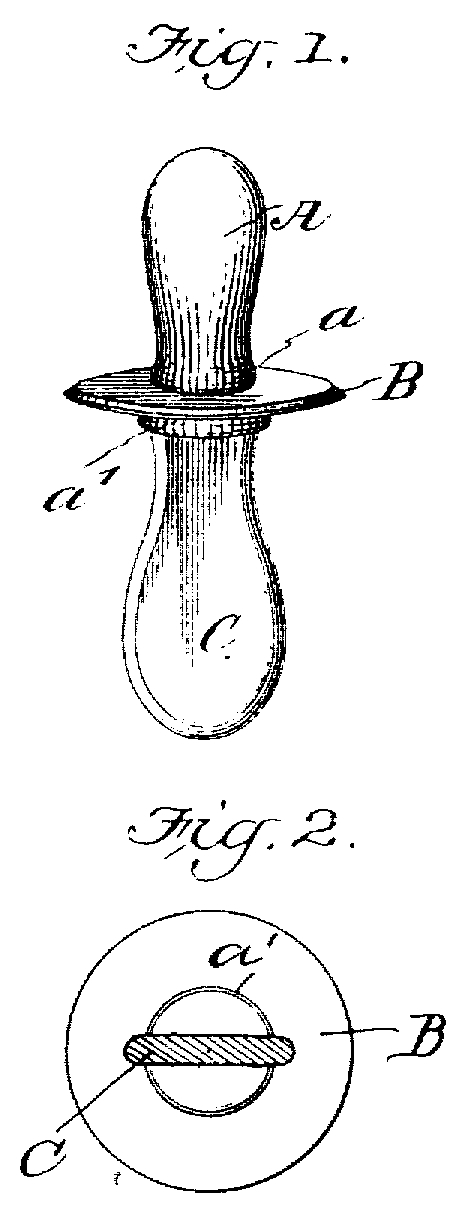
Baby comforter design, 1900

In England in the 17th–19th centuries, a "coral" was a teething toy made of coral, ivory or bone, often mounted in silver as the handle of a rattle. A museum curator has suggested that these substances were used as "sympathetic magic" and that the animal bone could symbolize animal strength to help the child cope with pain.

Pacifiers were a development of hard teething rings, but they were also a substitute for the softer sugar tits, sugar-teats, or sugar-rags which had been in use in 19th century America. A writer in 1873 described a "sugar-teat" made from "a small piece of old linen" with a "spoonful of rather sandy sugar in the center of it", "gathered ... up into a little ball" with a thread tied tightly around it. Rags with foodstuffs tied inside were also given to babies in many parts of Northern Europe and elsewhere. In some places a lump of meat or fat was tied in cloth, and sometimes the rag was moistened with brandy. German-speaking areas might use Lutschbeutel, cloth wrapped around sweetened bread or poppy-seeds.

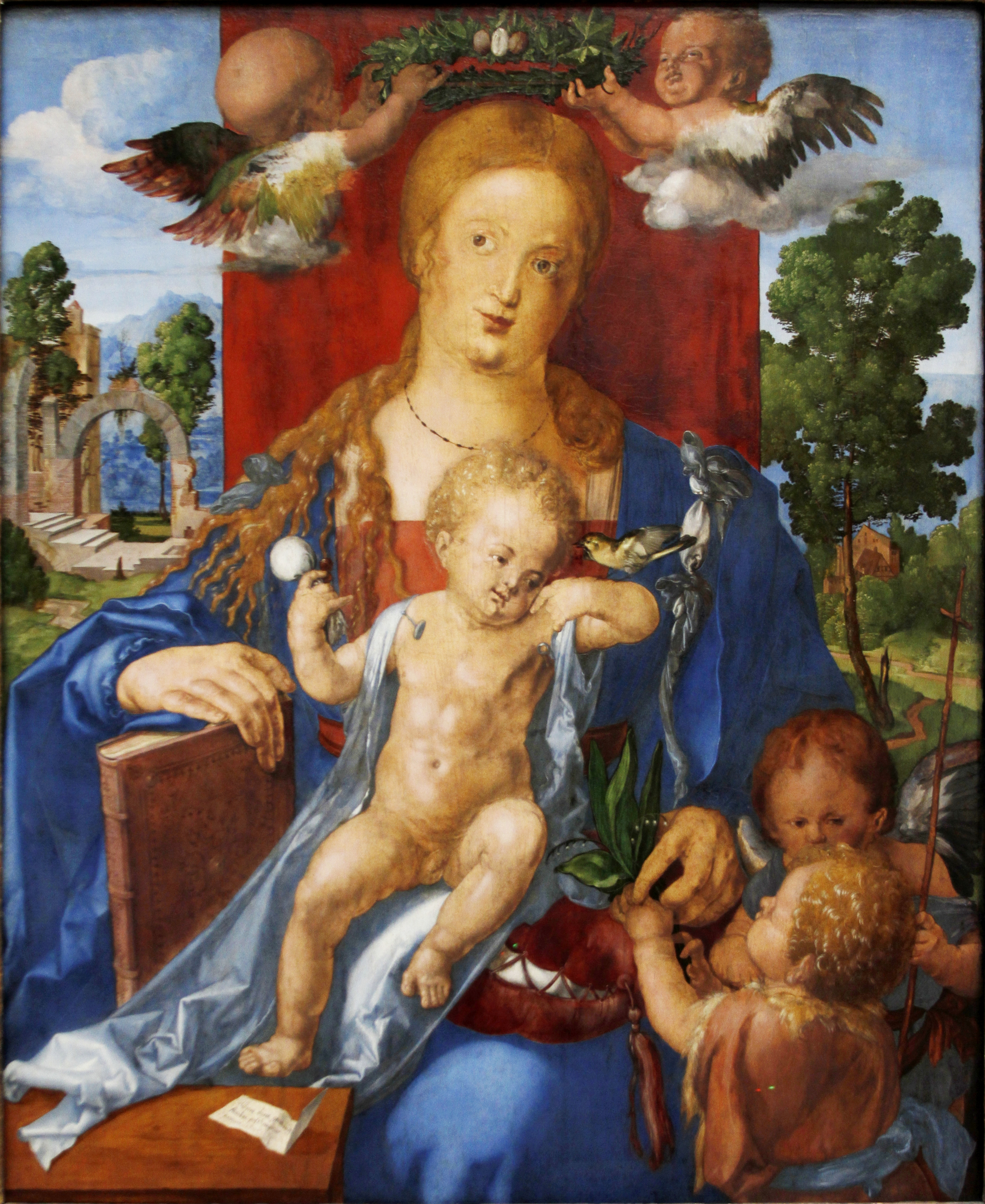
Albrecht Dürer, Madonna with the Siskin, 1506

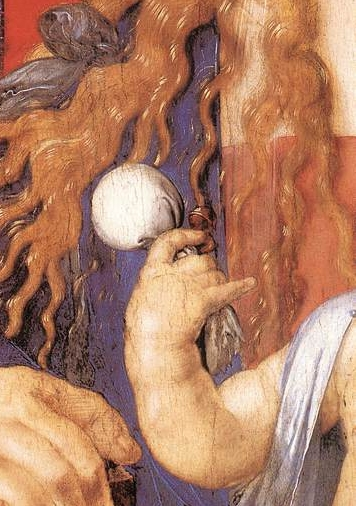
Albrecht Dürer, Madonna with the Siskin detail, 1506

A Madonna and child painted by Dürer in 1506 shows one of these tied-cloth "pacifiers" in the baby's hand.

Pacifiers were settling into their modern form around 1900 when the first teat, shield and handle design was patented in the US as a "baby comforter" by New Jersey pharmacist Christian W. Meinecke. Rubber had been used in flexible teethers sold as "elastic gum rings" for British babies in the mid-19th century, and also used for feeding-bottle teats. In 1902, Sears, Roebuck & Co. advertised a "new style rubber teething ring, with one hard and one soft nipple". In 1909, someone calling herself "Auntie Pacifier" wrote to the New York Times to warn of the "menace to health" (she meant dental health) of "the persistent, and, among poorer classes, the universal sucking of a rubber nipple sold as a 'pacifier'". In England too, dummies were seen as something the poorer classes would use, and associated with poor hygiene. In 1914, a London doctor complained about "the dummy teat": "If it falls on the floor it is rubbed momentarily on the mother's blouse or apron, lipped by the mother and replaced in the baby's mouth."

Early pacifiers were manufactured with a choice of black, maroon or white rubber, though the white rubber of the day contained a certain amount of lead. Binky (with a y) was first used in about 1935 as a trademarked brand name for pacifiers and other baby products manufactured by the Binky Baby Products Company of New York. The brand trademark is owned by Playtex in the U.S. (and other countries).

== Drawbacks ==
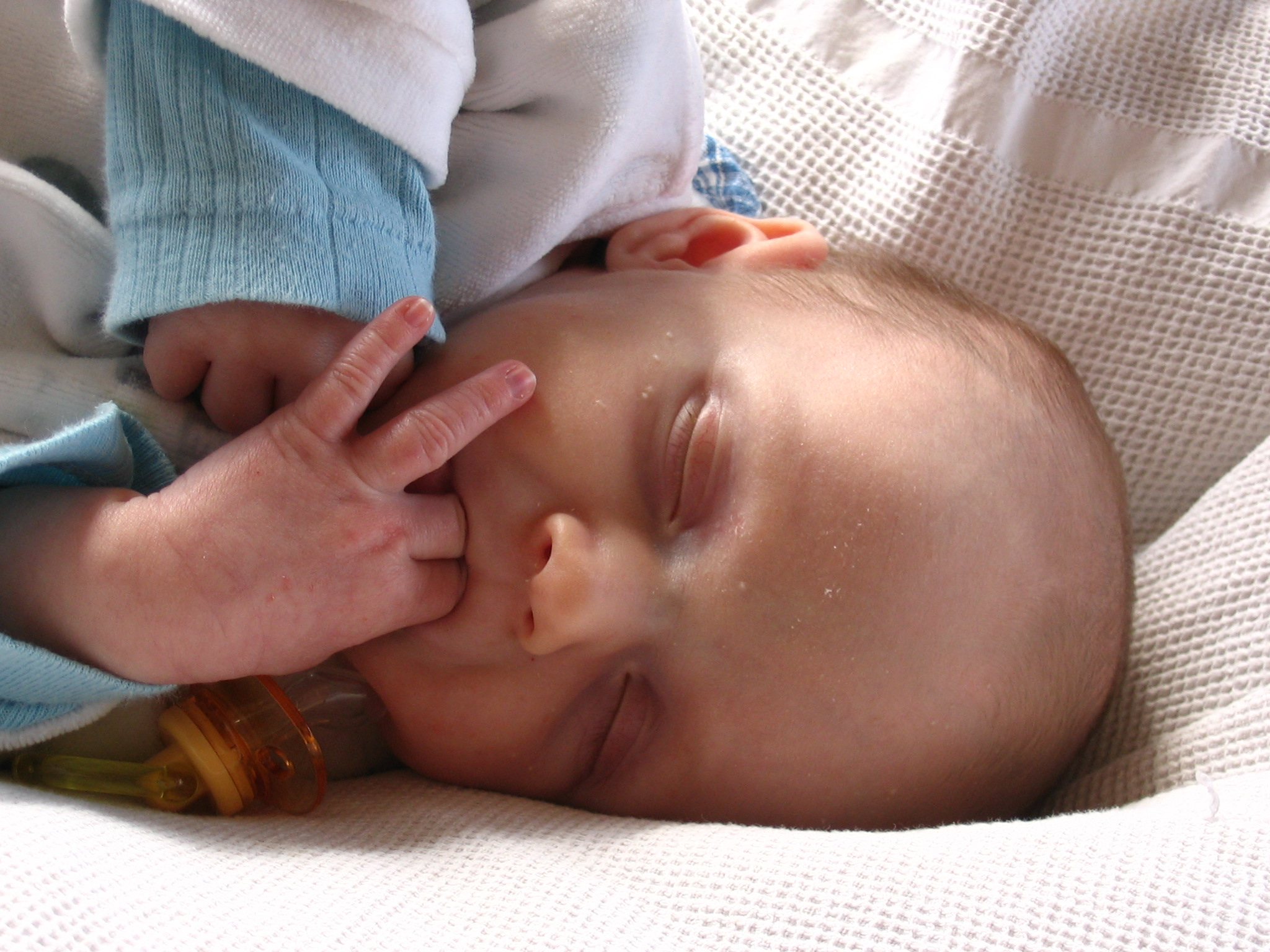
Infants may use a pacifier, their fingers or thumb to soothe themselves.

There are negative effects from using a pacifier during breastfeeding for healthy babies. The AAP suggests avoiding pacifiers for the first month. Introducing a pacifier can lead to the infant ineffectively sucking at the breast and causing "nipple confusion". Babies will take their need to suck out on the pacifier instead of nursing or comfort nursing at the breast which is good for the mother's supply. Evidence in premature infants or infants that are not healthy is lacking but shows that it can have benefits. It may have clinical benefits for preterm babies, such as helping them progress from tube to bottle feeding.

Infants who use pacifiers may have more ear infections (otitis media). The effectiveness of avoiding the use of a pacifier to prevent ear infections is not known.

Although it is commonly believed that using a pacifier will lead to dental problems, it does not appear to lead to long-term damage if used for less than around three years. However, prolonged use of a pacifier or other non-nutritive sucking habit (such as finger or blanket sucking) has been found to lead to malocclusion of the teeth, that is teeth sticking out or not meeting properly when they bite together. This is a common problem and the dental (orthodontic) treatment to correct it can take a long time and can be expensive. A Cochrane Review of the evidence found that orthodontic braces or psychological intervention (such as positive or negative reinforcement) were effective in helping children stop sucking habits where that was necessary. An orthodontic brace that used a palatal crib design seems to have been more effective than a palatal arch design.

There appears to be no strong evidence that using a pacifier delays speech development by preventing babies from practicing their speaking skills.

== Benefits ==
The American Academy of Pediatric Dentistry's (AAPD) policy on pacifier use in the first months of life is to support the parental decision. Pacifier use is associated with a lower risk of developing a habit of finger sucking. The messaging from the AAPD is that prolonged use of a pacifier after 1 year of age can increase the risk of otitis media and use of a pacifier after 1.5 years (18 months) can have a negative effect on the development of the baby's orofacial complex that can lead to bite and cross bite problems.

There is some evidence that pacifiers can decrease the risk of sudden infant death syndrome (SIDS). The researchers are divided over whether this association is sufficient reason to prefer pacifier use. Some argue that pacifiers should be recommended on the strength of an association, just as back sleeping was recommended on the strength of an association. Others argue that the association is not strong enough or that the mechanism is unclear.

Pacifiers can help premature infants as they develop their reflexes including the sucking reflex.

Pacifiers can also provide comfort and some amount of pain-reliever effect if an infants requires a minor procedure. Pacifiers have also been found to reduce infants' crying during painful procedures such as venipuncture.

Researchers in Brazil have shown that neither "orthodontic" nor standard pacifiers prevent dental problems if children continue sucking past the age of three years.

It is commonly reported anecdotally that pacifier use among stimulant users helps reduce bruxism and thus prevents tooth damage. It is also known to help infants and toddlers to get to sleep and also keeps infants and toddlers calm.

== Medical policies ==
The American Academy of Pediatric Dentistry's "Policy on Thumb, Finger and Pacifier Habits" says: "Most children stop sucking on thumbs, pacifiers or other objects on their own between 2 and 4 years of age. However, some children continue these habits over long periods of time. In these children, the upper front teeth may tip toward the lip or not come in properly. Frequent or intense habits over a prolonged period of time can affect the way the child's teeth bite together, as well as the growth of the jaws and bones that support the teeth."

A study of sudden infant death syndrome (SIDS) states that "It seems appropriate to stop discouraging the use of pacifiers." The authors recommend the use of pacifiers at nap time and bedtime throughout the first year of life. For breastfeeding mothers, the authors suggest waiting until breastfeeding is well established, typically for several weeks, before introducing the pacifier.

The British Oral Health Foundation recommends: "If you can, avoid using a dummy, soother or pacifier and discourage thumb sucking. These can both eventually cause problems with how the teeth grow and develop. And this may need treatment with a brace when the child gets older."

== Prevalence of attachments to pacifiers and their psychological functions ==
In the late 1960s researchers dispelled the notion that pacifiers were psychologically unhealthy and aberrant. Richard H. Passman and Jane S. Halonen at the University of Wisconsin-Milwaukee traced the developmental course of attachments to pacifiers and provided norms. They found that 66% of their sample of babies who were three months old in the United States demonstrated at least some attachment, according to their mothers. At six months of age, this incidence was 40%, and at nine months it was 44%. Thereafter, the rate of attachment to pacifiers dropped precipitously until, at 24 months of age and later, it was quite rare.

These researchers also provided experimental support for what were then only anecdotal observations that pacifiers do indeed pacify babies. In an unfamiliar playroom, one-year-old toddlers accompanied by their pacifier evidenced more play and demonstrated less distress than did babies without them. The investigators concluded that pacifiers should be considered to be attachment objects, similar to other security objects like blankets.

Passman and Halonen contended that the widespread occurrence of attachments to pacifiers as well as their importance as security objects should reassure parents that they are a normal part of development for a majority of infants and toddlers.

== See also ==
- Pacifier-activated lullaby
- Comfort object
