= Nipple confusion =

Tendency of an infant to unsuccessfully adapt between breast-feeding and bottle-feeding

Nipple confusion is the tendency of an infant to unsuccessfully adapt between breast-feeding and bottle-feeding. It can happen when the infant is put back onto breast-feeding. Nipple confusion can turn into nipple refusal in which the infant refuses both the bottle and breastfeeding.

Preventing nipple confusion requires avoiding bottles and pacifiers for the first few weeks after birth. An infant that is used to feeding at the breast and gets switched to a bottle cannot use the same technique as latching on to the breast. An infant who gets used to nipple on a bottle and fast-flowing milk can have trouble making the transition.

Nipple confusion or nipple preference may occur when an infant switches from the breast to an artificial feeding method before the proper breastfeeding routine is established. Young infants who are exposed to artificial teats or bottle nipples might find the switch back and forth from bottle to breast a little tricky as the feeding mechanism of both breasts and bottle differ. An infant learns to feed on different nipples differently.

== Causes ==
How an infant feeds from the breast to bottle differs. A breastfed infant regulates the suction required for the flow of milk from the breast by using small pauses to breathe and to swallow. On the other hand, for a bottle-fed infant, they do not have to create suction as the flow from the bottle allows for a continuous flow. When switched back to the breast, the infant faces sudden confusion regarding the lack of continuous flow that they got adapted to. Bottle-feeding requires no serious effort whereas breastfeeding demands the usage of at least 40 muscles in the infant’s face. This could make it difficult for the infant to latch efficiently and be breastfed well after being fed from the bottle.

== Prevention ==
If the parent does not wait for the infant to perfect their breastfeeding skill, there is a risk the infant might give up breastfeeding sooner than preferred. While some infants easily go back and forth from bottle to breast, not all infants find this constant transitioning easy. However, infants are born with strong instincts to get breastfed. With patience and practice, the infant can be soothed into good feeding habits. Since there is no way to predict whether an infant might face nipple confusion, the use of a bottle or pacifier should be delayed, at least until the infant is four weeks old. This allows the infant to get used to breastfeeding at an early stage. Breastfeeding is advocated for the first two to three weeks. It is important that the infant is latching on well and that the breast milk reserve is well established. In case giving supplements to the infant is medically necessary, they can be given in ways that do not involve artificial nipples.

Nipple confusion can result in sub optimal nutrition for the infant and using artificial nipples is discouraged by the World Health Organization. The American College of Paediatrics recommends the use of pacifiers to prevent sudden infant death syndrome. This, however, conflicts with the recommendations of the World Health Organisation to discourage the use of artificial nipples because it may cause nipple confusion and then inadequate nutrition.

== "Un-confusing" the infant ==
For getting the infant habituated, what is recommended is breastfeeding only when the infant is calm, not switching the infant back to the breast when they are extremely hungry, and more skin-to-skin contact (during breast-feeding) would help reacquaint them. For some special instances, the usage of a nipple shield can be considered to lure the infant back to breastfeeding. To switch to a bottle, a slow-flow nipple is recommended so that the infant has time to adapt to the new technique of feeding. A bottle system that imitates the natural breastfeeding motions of the infant makes the transition of bottle to breast easier. A parent can provide instant gratification to the infant by making it easier for them to feed from the breast. This can be done manually or by pumping your breast milk before the feeding starts, so the process of breastfeeding is a little less hard. Parents facing difficulties can consider a Lactation Consultant or advice from their paediatrician.

== See also ==
- Baby Friendly Hospital Initiative
- Breastfeeding promotion
- Haberman Feeder
- Infant formula
- International Code of Marketing of Breast-milk Substitutes
- List of bottle types, brands and companies
