= Edematous areola =

Breast disease

An edematous areola is a swollen and tender inflammation of the areola of the breast. It can develop after childbirth when large amounts of fluids are given intravenously, use of pitocin or fluid retention for other reasons, and may interfere with successful initiation of breastfeeding. An edematous areola can also develop in women with preeclampsia.

== See also ==
- Breast milk
- Nipple prosthesis for breast cancer survivors
- Nipple shield
- Breastfeeding
