= Blocked milk duct =

Temporary medical condition

- Other names: Clogged milk duct

A blocked milk duct (sometimes also called plugged or clogged milk duct) is a blockage of one or more ducts carrying milk to the nipple for the purpose of breastfeeding an infant that can cause mastitis. The symptoms are a tender, localised lump in one breast, with redness in the skin over the lump. The cause of a blocked milk duct is the failure to remove milk from part of the breast. This may be due to infrequent breastfeeding, poor attachment, tight clothing or trauma to the breast. Sometimes the duct to one part of the breast is blocked by thickened milk. A blocked milk duct can be managed by improving the removal of milk and correcting the underlying cause.

It is common to have blocked milk ducts during breastfeeding.

== Symptoms and signs ==
A blocked milk duct has the following common symptoms:

- Low fever and breast infection
- Pain in a particular side of the breast
- Swollen or tender lump in the breast
- Slower milk flow
- a small white blister on the nipple called a milk bleb
- swelling or redness of the breast
- areas of the breast that are hot or warm to touch
- the infant may feel fussy when feeding from the affected breast

== Causes ==
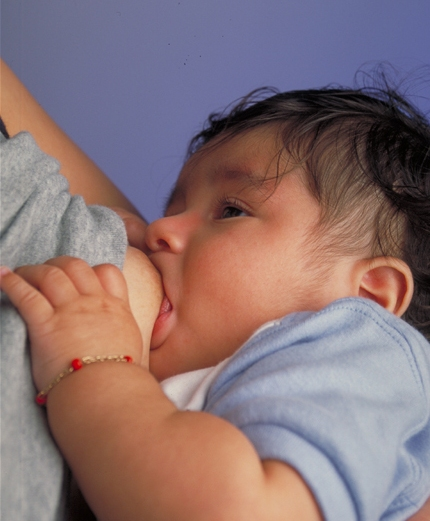
Breastfeeding infant

Blocked milk ducts are a common breastfeeding problem and can be caused due to a number of reasons:

- When the infant does not latch properly
- Wearing a tight bra or tight clothing can restrict the breasts and put pressure on them leading to a blocked milk duct
- A bad or weak pump could lead to a drainage issue
- When the breast milk is not removed regularly, the milk can back up and create a blockage
- A nipple bleb can also block the milk duct
- When the body produces milk in over abundance, it can engorge the breast and hence lead to a blockage
- Other reasons include fatigue, over exercise, dehydration and weaning.

== Treatment ==
The most effective treatment against blocked milk ducts is to empty the affected breasts by frequent breastfeeding or pumping. Numerous other treatment approaches have been suggested, however, there is insufficient clinical research to determine the effectiveness. Treatments that have been studied but have no strong evidence for or against their use:

- A gentle massage of the affected breast Sometimes after gentle massage over the lump, a string of the thickened milk comes out through the nipple, followed by a stream of milk, and rapid relief of the blocked duct.
- Ensuring a correct positioning and latching of the baby
- Wearing loose clothing items that do not bind the breasts
- Applying warm compresses
- Drinking a specialized herbal tea
- Acupuncture
- Gua-Sha
- Proteolytic enzymes

A blocked milk duct can result from a nipple bleb. Both of these can lead to mastitis.
