= Fissure of the nipple =

- Other names: Jogger's nipple, Surfer's nipple
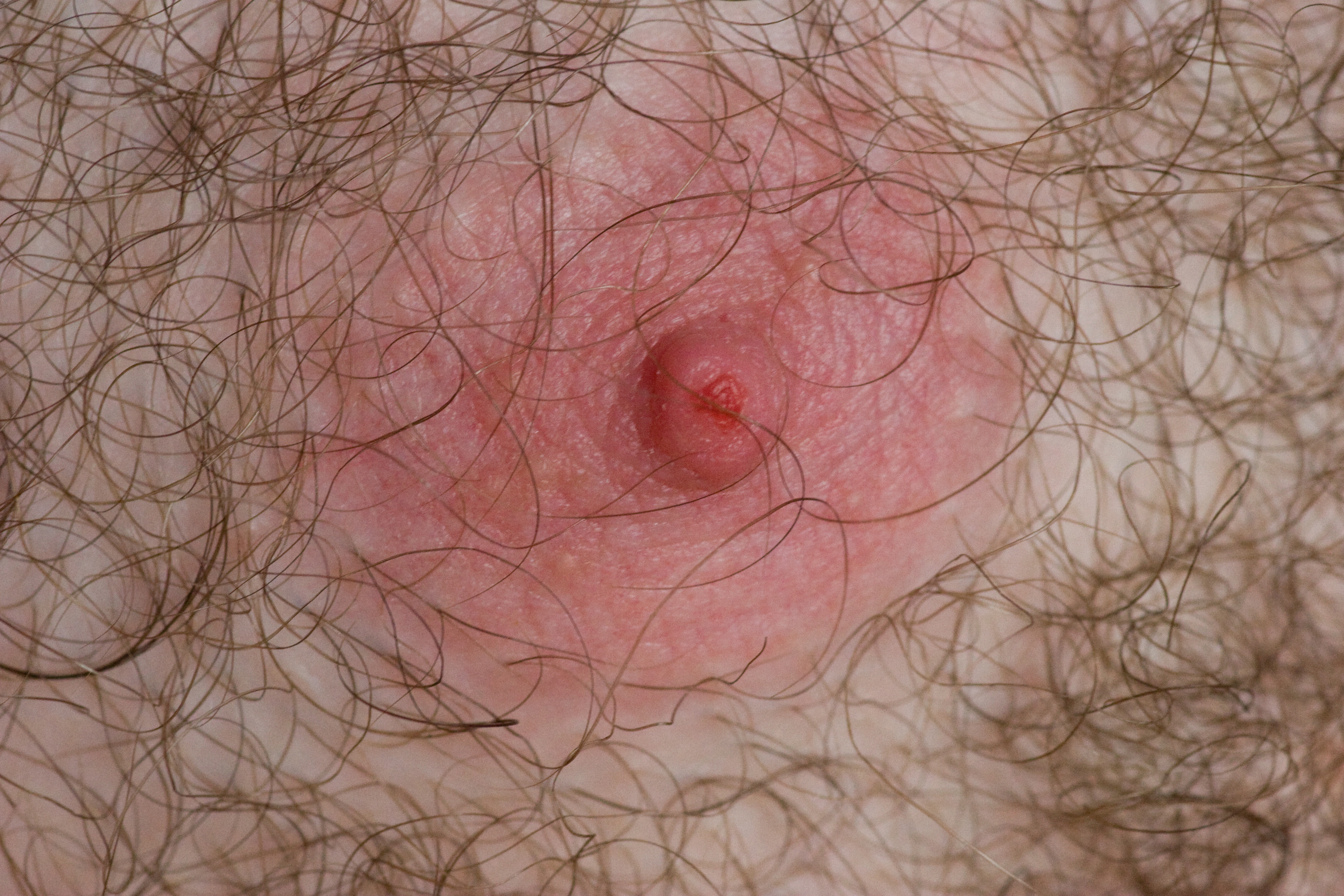
- An irritated nipple, or jogger's nipple, acquired by a man while riding a bike on a warm day.
- Specialty: Dermatology
- Causes: Chafing during physical exercise
- Prevention: Running shirtless, Nipple patches, Sports bras
- Treatment: Petroleum jelly
- Frequency: 2–16% of runners

Fissure of the nipple, colloquially referred to as jogger's nipple, is a condition that is the result of chafing of one or both nipples. This can occur in both men and women during physical exercise such as long-distance running where there is prolonged friction between the nipple and clothing. The issue is also commonly seen in surfers who do not wear rash guards or wetsuits.

== See also ==
- Cracked nipple
- List of cutaneous conditions
