= Nipple bleb =

Fluid filled blister on the nipple

- Specialty: Dermatology

A nipple bleb is a blister on the nipple that can be filled with serous or other fluid. It may be pink or light yellow. It is thin-walled and may appear as a small blister, more than 5 mm in diameter. It can also be referred to as a bulla. Some clinicians may also include milk blisters as a type of bleb.This condition usually disappears within two days. In addition, a blocked Montgomery gland may also be called a nipple bleb though its cause is different than a milk or serous-filled bleb on the nipple. In some cases the bleb may be associated with an adjacent blocked sebaceous cyst.

It may be caused by a blocked pore that leads to seepage of milk or serous fluid under the epidermis. This causes a white 'bump' that appears opaque and shiny. If the bleb continues to block the flow of milk out of the breast it may develop into a blocked milk duct or even mastitis.

A nipple bleb is often treated by the woman herself since a warm saline soak and gentle washing may open the blister and cause it to drain.

== Symptoms ==
Shapeless raised, smooth, shiny, pimple-like, tiny bumps filled with water/fluid formed on breasts or in and around the nipple pore might appear. The colour of these fluid in nipple blebs may vary from white, yellow or transparent. They become flat when pressure is applied on them or punctured with hands. This can cause discomfort or pain to the lactating mother while breastfeeding.

== Treatment ==
In case of slight or painless blebs, it is advised to continue the breastfeed to unclog the milk duct or prevent it from clogging altogether. Breastfeeding mothers should make the baby latch properly. In case of pain after breastfeeding one can try wet, warm heating pads before and after each feeding. Ice packs can be soothing as well. One can massage the area applying gentle pressure around the duct to help loosen up the blockage. Tight-fitting bras should be avoided; if the cloth of the bra is rubbing against the nipples, a nursing pad can be used to ease the friction.

== See also ==
- Areola
- Intimate part
- Inverted nipple
- Lactation
- Mammary gland
