= Sippy cups =

Sippy cups may refer to:

- Sippy cup, a spill-proof drinking cup for toddlers
- The Sippy Cups, a band formed by Alison Faith Levy
- "Sippy Cup", a 2015 single by Melanie Martinez
