= Mandy Haberman =

English inventor and entrepreneur

Mandy Nicola Haberman
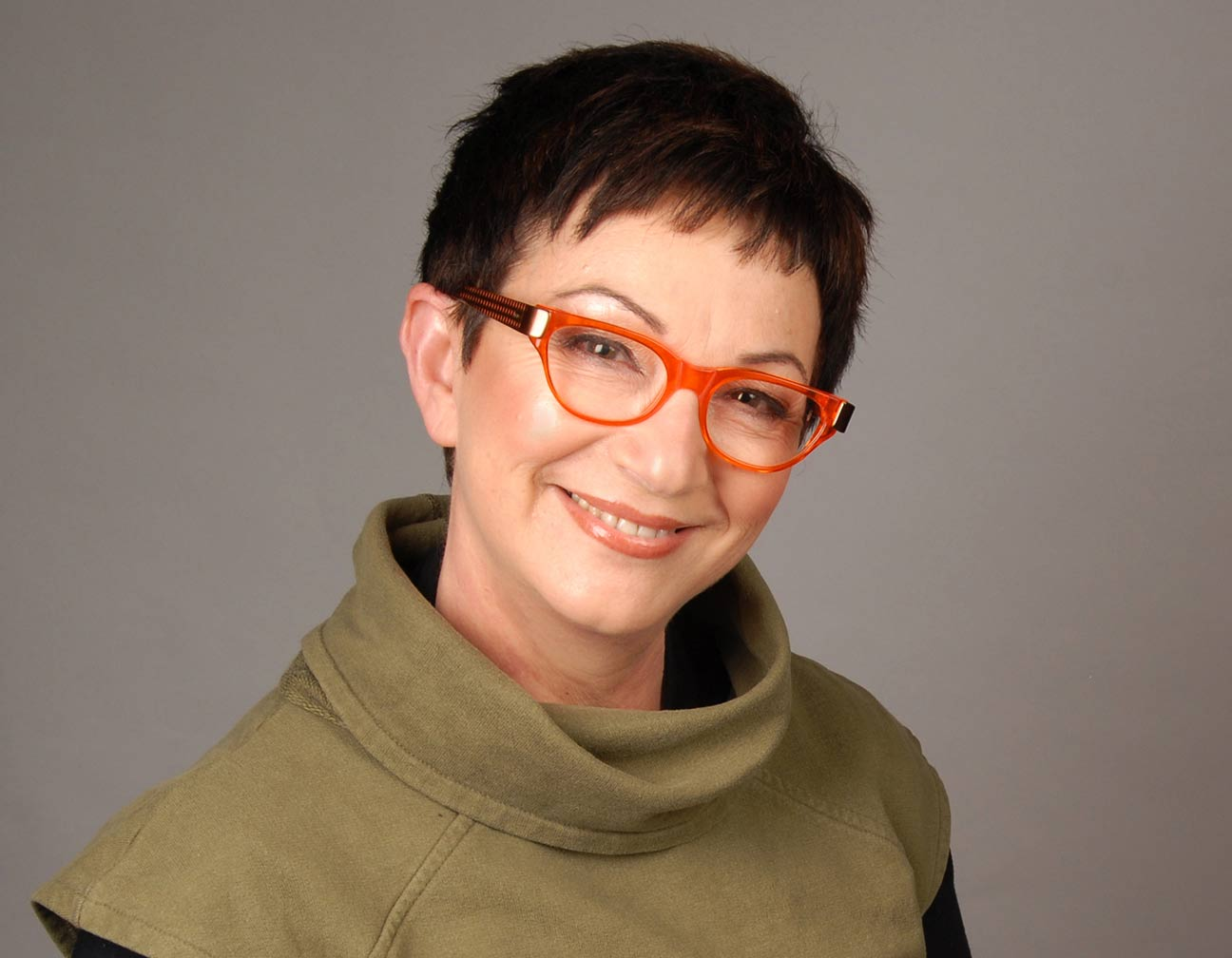
- Mandy Haberman
- Born: Barnet, Hertfordshire, United Kingdom
- Education: Enfield County School for Girls (1965-1972) Hornsey College of Art (1972-1973) University of the Arts (formerly Saint Martin's School of Art) (1973-1976)
- Occupation: Inventor
- Organization: Haberman Global Innovations
- Known for: Haberman Feeder Anywayup Cup Suckle Feeder
- Spouse: Professor Steven Haberman
- Children: 3
- Parent(s): Arnold and Sylvia Brecker
- Website: https://mandyhaberman.com

Mandy Nicola Haberman is an English inventor and entrepreneur. She is founding member and Freeman of the Guild of Entrepreneurs, Director of the Intellectual Property Awareness Network and a visiting Fellow at Bournemouth University, from where she has an honorary doctorate. She is best known for her successfully upheld patent enforcement battles and inventing the Haberman Feeder, the Anywayup Cup and the Suckle Feeder.

== Inventions ==
After her daughter was born in 1980 with Stickler syndrome, a congenital abnormality characterized by distinctive facial abnormalities, ocular problems, hearing loss, and joint and skeletal problems first studied by Gunnar B. Stickler in 1965, Haberman invented the Haberman Feeder bottle for infants with feeding difficulties, described as “a significant advance in the feeding of infants with cleft palates and should be a preferred feeder rather than conventional means." Her second invention was the Anywayup cup, an intuitive and simple to use non-spill trainer cup, which has received numerous awards for both innovation and design. In 2018, Haberman launched the Suckle Feeder anti-obesity, paced feeding technology to address all common causes of colic and to facilitate feeding by natural breastfeeding action.

== Intellectual Property Rights ==
Following her successful defence of patent infringements, Haberman has become a campaigner for improvements in the patent system, is an advocate of intellectual property rights, and is committed to raising awareness, educating and campaigning to help make it more accessible for SMEs and individuals. She was as a non-executive board member of the Intellectual Property Office between 2015 and 2020.

== Awards ==
Haberman was the British Female Inventor and Innovative Network (BFIIN) Female Inventor of the Year 2000. She won the Design Effectiveness Awards 2000.
