= Stickler syndrome =

Genetic connective tissue disorder

Stickler syndrome (hereditary progressive arthro-ophthalmopathy)
- Other names: AOM, Marshall-Stickler syndrome, Stickler dysplasia
- Stickler syndrome is inherited in an autosomal dominant pattern.
- Specialty: Medical genetics

Stickler syndrome (hereditary progressive arthro-ophthalmodystrophy) is a group of rare genetic disorders affecting connective tissue, specifically collagen. Stickler syndrome is a subtype of collagenopathy, types II and XI. Stickler syndrome is characterized by distinctive facial abnormalities, ocular problems, hearing loss, and joint and skeletal problems. It was first studied and characterized by Gunnar B. Stickler in 1965.

== Signs and symptoms ==
Individuals with Stickler syndrome experience a range of signs and symptoms. Some people have no signs and symptoms; others have some or all of the features described below. In addition, each feature of this syndrome may vary from subtle to severe.

A characteristic feature of Stickler syndrome is a somewhat flattened facial appearance. This is caused by underdeveloped bones in the middle of the face, including the cheekbones and the bridge of the nose. A particular group of physical features, called the Pierre Robin sequence, is common in children with Stickler syndrome. Pierre Robin sequence includes a U-shaped or sometimes V-shaped cleft palate (an opening in the roof of the mouth) with a tongue that is too large for the space formed by the small lower jaw. Children with a cleft palate are also prone to ear infections and occasionally swallowing difficulties.

Many people with Stickler syndrome are very nearsighted (described as having high myopia) because of the shape of the eye. People with eye involvement are prone to increased pressure within the eye (ocular hypertension) which could lead to glaucoma and tearing or detachment of the light-sensitive retina of the eye (retinal detachment). Cataract may also present as an ocular complication associated with Stickler's Syndrome. The jelly-like substance within the eye (the vitreous humour) has a distinctive appearance in the types of Stickler syndrome associated with the COL2A1 and COL11A1 genes. As a result, regular appointments to a specialist ophthalmologist are advised. The type of Stickler syndrome associated with the COL11A2 gene does not affect the eye.

People with this syndrome have problems that affect things other than the eyes and ears. Arthritis, abnormality to ends of long bones, vertebrae abnormality, curvature of the spine, scoliosis, joint pain, and double jointedness are all problems that can occur in the bones and joints. Physical characteristics of people with Stickler can include flat cheeks, flat nasal bridge, small upper jaw, pronounced upper lip groove, small lower jaw, and palate abnormalities; these tend to lessen with age and normal growth and palate abnormalities can be treated with routine surgery. Another characteristic of this syndrome is a mild spondyloepiphyseal dysplasia which can cause reduced height.

Another sign of Stickler syndrome is mild to severe hearing loss that, for some people, may be progressive (see hearing loss with craniofacial syndromes). The joints of affected children and young adults may be very flexible (hypermobile). Arthritis often appears at an early age and worsens as a person gets older. Learning difficulties not due to a deficit in intelligence can also occur because of hearing and sight impairments if the school is not informed and the student is not assisted within the learning environment.

Stickler syndrome is thought to be associated with an increased incidence of mitral valve prolapse of the heart, although no definitive research supports this.

== Causes ==
The syndrome is thought to arise from a mutation of several collagen genes during fetal development. It is a sex independent autosomal dominant trait meaning a person with the syndrome has a 50% chance of passing it on to each child. There are three variants of Stickler syndrome identified, each associated with a collagen biosynthesis gene. A metabolic defect concerning the hyaluronic acid and the collagen of the 2-d type is assumed to be the cause of this syndrome.

== Genetics ==
Mutations in the COL11A1, COL11A2 and COL2A1 genes cause Stickler syndrome. These genes are involved in the production of type II and type XI collagen. Collagens are complex molecules that provide structure and strength to connective tissue (the tissue that supports the body's joints and organs). Mutations in any of these genes disrupt the production, processing, or assembly of type II or type XI collagen. Defective collagen molecules or reduced amounts of collagen affect the development of bones and other connective tissues, leading to the characteristic features of Stickler syndrome.

Other, as yet unknown, genes may also cause Stickler syndrome because not all individuals with the condition have mutations in one of the three identified genes.

== Diagnosis ==
=== Types ===
Genetic changes are related to the following types of Stickler syndrome:

- Stickler syndrome, COL2A1 (75% of Stickler cases)
- Stickler syndrome, COL11A1
- Stickler syndrome, COL11A2 (non-ocular)
- Stickler syndrome, COL9A1 (recessive variant)
- Stickler syndrome, COL9A2 (recessive variant)
- Stickler syndrome, COL9A3 (recessive variant)
- Stickler Syndrome, LOX3 (Recessive, 7 cases reported)

Whether there are two or three types of Stickler syndrome is controversial. Each type is presented here according to the gene involved. The classification of these conditions is changing as researchers learn more about the genetic causes.

== History ==
Scientists associated with the discovery of this syndrome include:

- Gunnar B. Stickler

== See also ==
- Mandy Haberman, invented the Haberman Feeder
- Marshall syndrome
- Pierre Robin sequence
