= Wilhelmsgymnasium (Munich) =

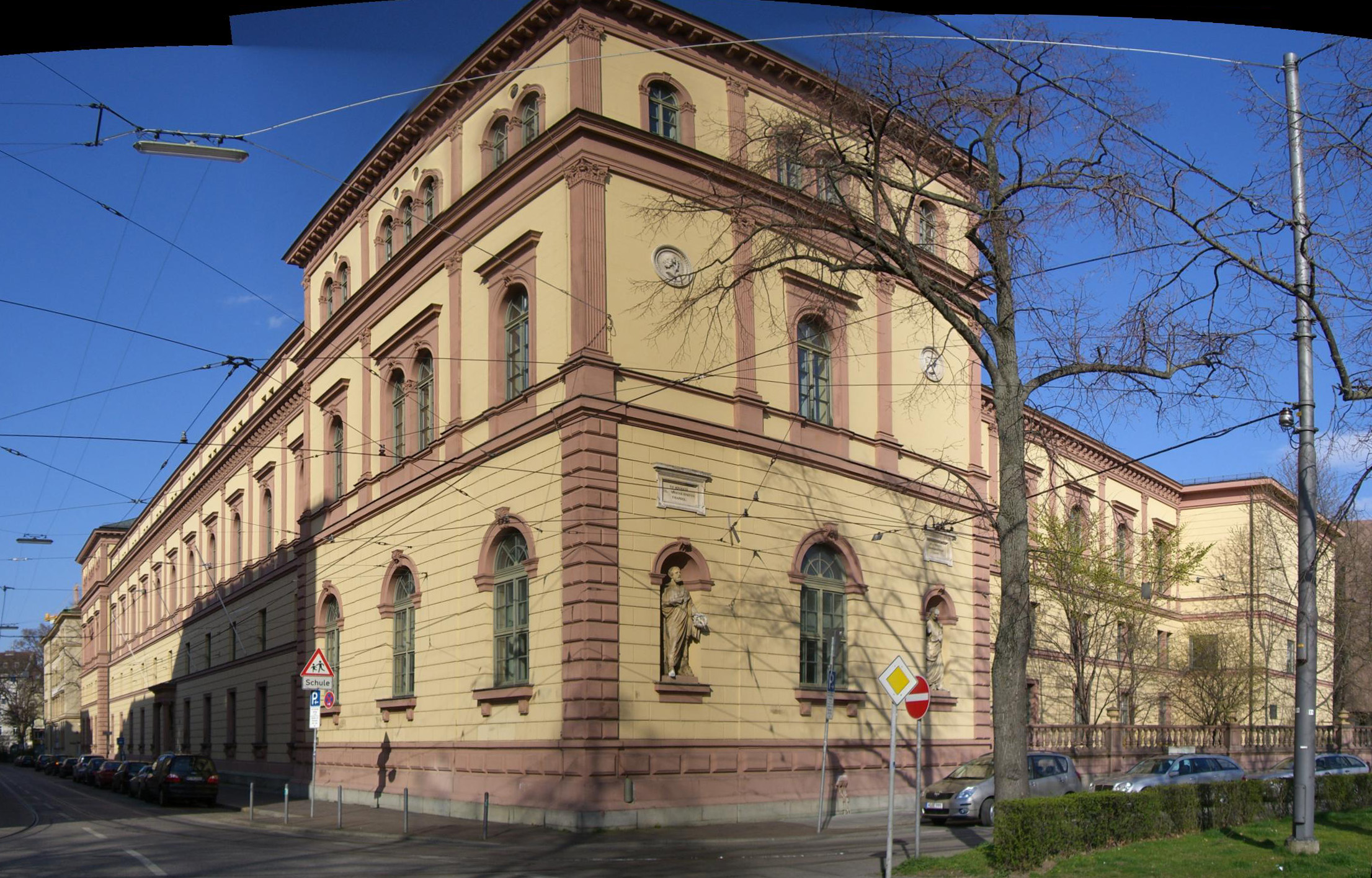

Location
- Thierschstraße 46; Munich, Bavaria, 80538; Germany
- 48°08′17″N 11°35′19″E

Information
- Type: State gymnasium
- Established: 1559; 467 years ago
- Headmaster: Michael Hotz
- Deputy Head: Brigitte Waltenberger
- Gender: Coeducational
- Enrolment: 600~
- Website: www.wilhelmsgymnasium.de

The Wilhelmsgymnasium is a gymnasium (selective school) in Munich, Germany. Founded in 1559 to educate local boys, it is now coeducational.

Wilhelmsgymnasium is one of the few remaining gymnasiums in Bavaria to be a "pure Humanistisches Gymnasium" (humanities gymnasium), meaning that it traditionally focuses on the Classics: all students are required to study Latin, English, and Ancient Greek, in addition to mainstream school subjects.

== History ==
The Gymnasium was founded in 1559 by Duke Albrecht V of Bavaria as a "Paedagogium", but was renamed in 1849 after its probable sponsor, Duke Wilhelm V Up until the suppression of the Jesuits in 1773, the Gymnasium was overseen by the Jesuits ("Jesuit Gymnasium") at what is now called the Old Academy. Although the Jesuits were later restored, the gymnasium became a state-run institution on different sites from that time forth. The present building on Thierschstraße (corner of Maximilianstraße) was erected in 1879 in Neo-Renaissance style. In 1893, it was granted Seminarschule status, meaning it accepted trainee teachers.

Much of the school compound was destroyed during the Allied bombing of Munich in 1944 and was eventually rebuilt over the years. Girls were admitted during the 1970s. Between 2015 and 2018, the school operated temporarily while the historic building's interior was completely gutted and refurbished with modern facilities. It re-opened for the 2018–19 academic year.

== Notable former pupils ==
- Johannes R. Becher
- Count Otto von Bray-Steinburg
- Anton Diabelli
- Lion Feuchtwanger
- Franz Xaver Gabelsberger
- Heinrich Himmler
- Carl Jung
- Philipp Loewenfeld
- Golo Mann
- Klaus Mann
- Max von Pettenkofer
- Richard Riemerschmid
- Albi Rosenthal
- Johann Georg Seidenbusch
- Carl Spitzweg
- Franz Schenk Freiherr von Stauffenberg
- Gunnar B. Stickler
- Hermann Stieve
- Ludwig Thoma
- Joseph von Utzschneider
- Konstantin Wecker
- Maximilian von Weichs
