= Milton sterilizing fluid =

Brand name of a sterilising compound

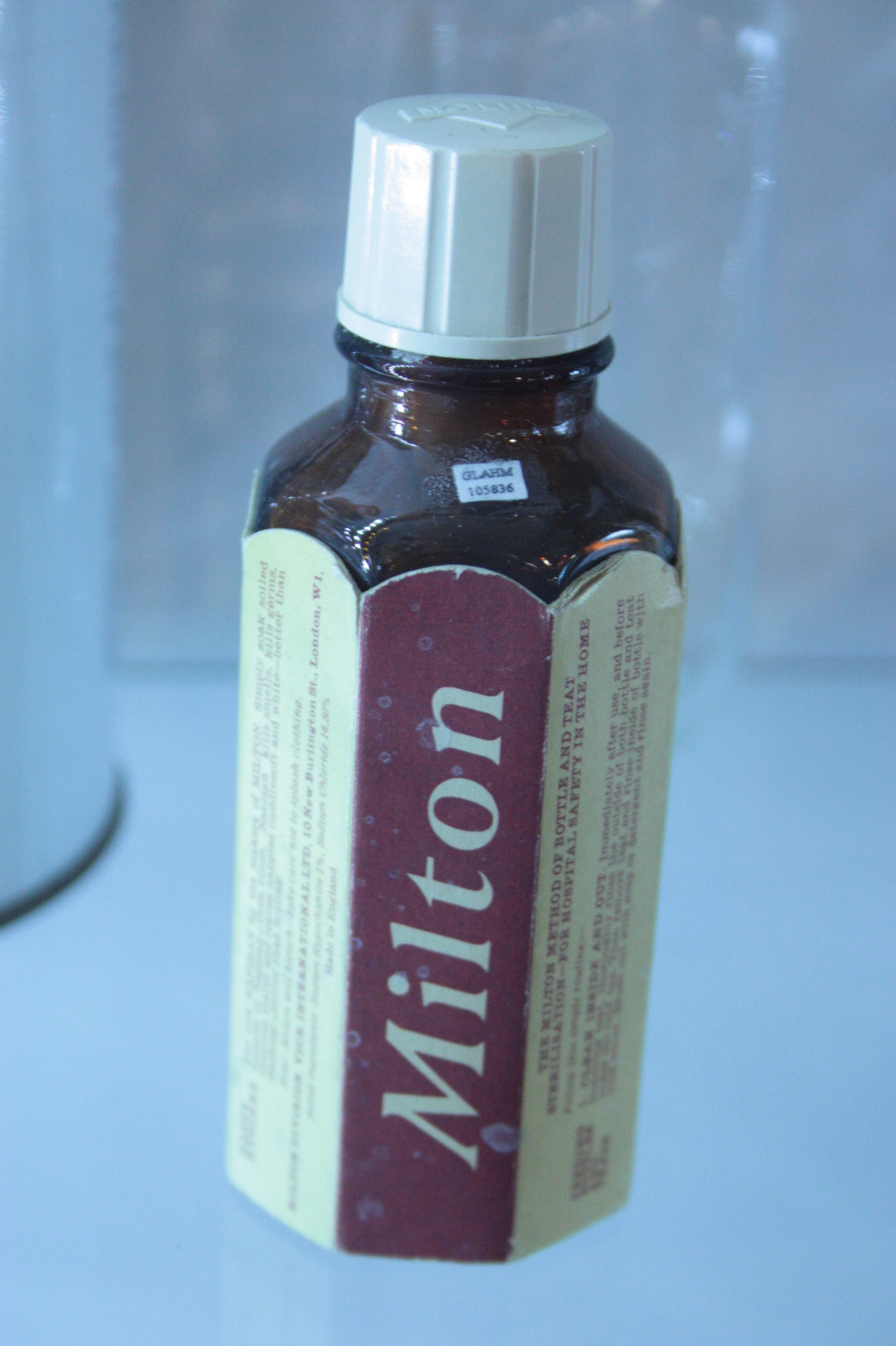
An inter-war bottle of Milton's Fluid, Hunterian Museum, Glasgow

Milton sterilizing fluid is produced by Procter & Gamble for sterilization uses. It contains 1% sodium hypochlorite (NaClO) and 16.5% sodium chloride (NaCl; common salt). 1:80 dilution is used to sterilise babies' feeding utensils, including baby bottles. It is sold in dissolvable tablets which are then mixed with cold water and placed in a lidded bucket. This method of bottle sterilization is marketed as "The Milton Method".

A 1:20 solution is isotonic with body fluids. 1:4 dilution is used for wound management applications; this contains 0.25% (w/v) available chlorine and has a pH of 10.5–11.2. The fluid has been used in endodontics, for example to irrigate an infected root canal, although it is not medically licensed for use in the mouth.

== History ==
The product and company began in Britain in 1916 and were named after the poet John Milton as a "safe" household name. During the First World War the fluid was used on the front to treat burns and skin conditions.

In 1947 a widespread outbreak of gastroenteritis in the UK caused the death of 4,500 children under the age of one. Many of these were in hospitals where the repeated sterilisation of glass baby bottles containing a small residue of milk by boiling them had resulted in invisible deposits of "milk stone"; these provided a medium for the growth of harmful bacteria.

This outbreak led to a national objective of finding an alternative to sterilising milk bottles by boiling, and Milton fluid was the antiseptic advocated by hospitals and government agencies. The cold water method was generally available and simple for all to use, and virtually all mothers adopted this method.
