= Marshall syndrome =

- Other names: Deafness, myopia, cataract, saddle nose-Marshall type
- Marshall syndrome and Stickler syndrome is inherited in an autosomal dominant pattern.

Marshall syndrome is a genetic disorder of the connective tissue that can cause hearing loss. The three most common areas to be affected are the eyes, which are uncommonly large, joints and the mouth and facial structures. Marshall syndrome is very similar to Stickler syndrome and because their features overlap so much, some experts consider them to be essentially the same disorder.

== Presentation ==
=== Eyes ===
Myopia is the most common eye problem in Marshall syndrome. Cataracts also occur more frequently and detached retina less frequently than in Stickler syndrome. Myopia also is the most common problem with the eyes in Stickler syndrome. In the latter syndrome, extreme myopia may lead to severe eye problems such as detached retina more frequently than in Marshall syndrome.

=== Joints ===
The joint changes include hyperextensibility (double-jointedness) and arthritis. Babies and young children with Stickler syndrome usually have very hyperextensible joints. As an affected child gets older, they may experience pain and stiffness from overuse of a joint. Osteoarthritis of the large joints often develops during the third or fourth decade. The joint changes in Marshall syndrome are of the same type but to a lesser degree. There also may be changes in the bones that show up on X-ray but they generally are not a problem.

=== Orofacial structure ===
The most severe problem associated with Stickler syndrome is Pierre Robin syndrome. This refers to a cleft palate resulting from a very small lower jaw. During early fetal life, the roof of the mouth is normally open and the sides of the palate have to come together to close. If the jaw is too small, there is not enough room for the tongue, which is then pushed up and gets in the way of the closing palate. Sometimes the chin is so small the baby has problems with eating and breathing if the tongue blocks the back of the throat. Cleft palate is found less frequently in Marshall Syndrome than in Stickler syndrome but still more frequently than in the general population.

The facial features of Marshall Syndrome include a flat midface, the appearance of large eyes, short upturned nose, and a round face. The facial features of Stickler syndrome are less prominent but include a rather long flat face, and depressed nasal bridge.

=== Hearing loss ===
The hearing loss associated with Stickler syndrome can be progressive and usually involves the high frequencies. Sensorineural hearing loss has been reported in as many as 100% and as low as 20% of affected individuals. A conductive loss due to otitis can magnify an existing sensorineural loss and is a frequent problem for children with Stickler or Marshall Syndrome.

== Genetics ==
Stickler syndrome and Marshall syndrome have an autosomal dominant pattern of inheritance. However, there is a great deal of variation within and among families with regard to gene expression. Some may be more severely affected and others may be very mildly affected. Often these syndromes are not recognized in a family until a baby is born with Pierre Robin syndrome or some members have detached retinas or cataracts at a young age.

Both syndromes where correlated with mutations in the COL11A1 gene.

== Diagnosis ==
Diagnosis is made based on features as well as by the very early onset of serious eye and ear disease. Because Marshall syndrome is an autosomal dominant hereditary disease, physicians can also note the characteristic appearance of the biological parent of the child. A genetic test can be performed in Stickler syndrome diagnosis is made by doing a genetic test for the several collagen genes as well as other genes that are associated with Stickler as well as considering the presence and severity of Spondyloepiphyseal Dysplasia with association of reduced height and growth rate as well as other connective tissue features like skin hyperextensibility and poor wound healing. It is an area of active research, also the genetic testing being expensive supports that the diagnosis is made depending on the features.

== Treatment ==
There is no medical treatment for either syndrome but there are some recommendations that can help with prevention or early identification of some of the problems. Children with either syndrome should have their hearing tested, and adults should be aware that the hearing loss may not develop until the adult years. Yearly visits to an ophthalmologist or other eye care professional who has been informed of the diagnosis of Stickler or Marshall syndrome is important for all affected individuals. Children should have the opportunity to have myopia corrected as early as possible, and treatment for cataracts or detached retinas may be more effective with early identification. Support for the joints is especially important during sports, and some recommend that contact sports should be avoided by those who have very loose joints.
