= Collagen, type XI, alpha 1 =

Protein found in humans

COL11A1

Identifiers
- Aliases: COL11A1, collagen, type XI, alpha 1, CO11A1, COLL6, STL2, collagen type XI alpha 1, collagen type XI alpha 1 chain, DFNA37
- External IDs: OMIM: 120280; MGI: 88446; GeneCards: COL11A1

Gene location (Human)
| Chr. | Chromosome 1 (human) |
| Band | 1p21.1 | Start | 102,876,467 bp |
| Band | 1p21.1 | End | 103,108,872 bp |

Gene location (Mouse)
| Chr. | Chromosome 3 (mouse) |
| Band | 3 F3|3 49.35 cM | Start | 113,824,189 bp |
| Band | 3 F3|3 49.35 cM | End | 114,014,367 bp |
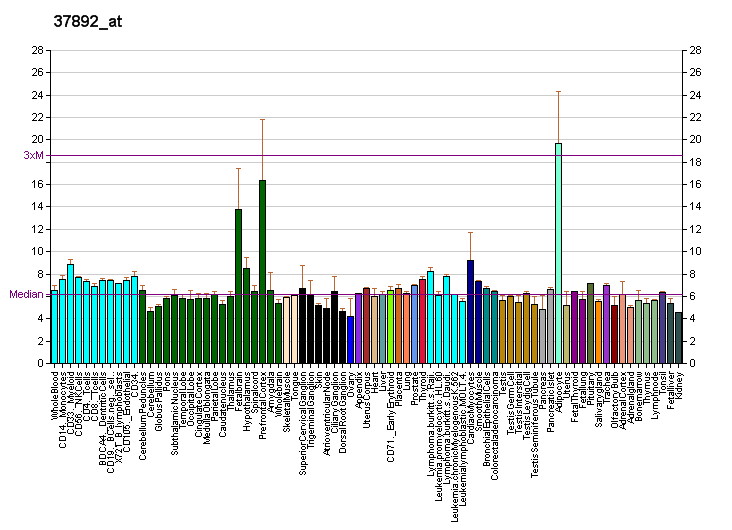

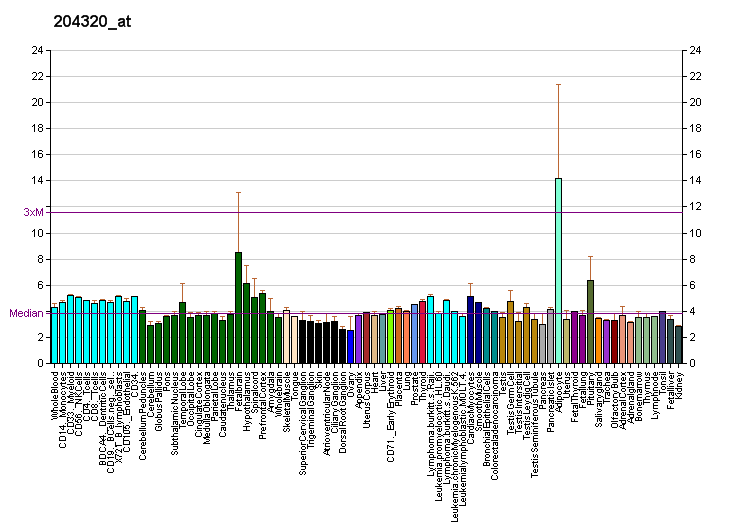
RNA expression pattern
| Bgee | Human / Mouse (ortholog); Top expressed in: tibia; cartilage tissue; periodontal fiber; ventricular zone; Achilles tendon; ganglionic eminence; germinal epithelium; hair follicle; optic nerve; visceral pleura / Top expressed in: body of femur; calvaria; vestibular sensory epithelium; molar; human fetus; tibiofemoral joint; fossa; stroma of bone marrow; condyle; intercostal muscle; More reference expression data |
| BioGPS | More reference expression data |
Gene ontology
| Molecular function | protein-macromolecule adaptor activity; metal ion binding; extracellular matrix binding; extracellular matrix structural constituent; heparin binding; heparan sulfate binding; extracellular matrix structural constituent conferring tensile strength |
| Cellular component | collagen; endoplasmic reticulum lumen; collagen type XI trimer; extracellular matrix; extracellular region; collagen-containing extracellular matrix; extracellular space |
| Biological process | embryonic skeletal system morphogenesis; endodermal cell differentiation; ossification; tendon development; skeletal system morphogenesis; chondrocyte development; heart morphogenesis; hearing; detection of mechanical stimulus involved in sensory perception of sound; ventricular cardiac muscle tissue morphogenesis; cartilage development; proteoglycan metabolic process; inner ear morphogenesis; cartilage condensation; visual perception; extracellular matrix organization; collagen fibril organization |
Sources:Amigo / QuickGO
Orthologs
| Databases | NCBI: entry; OMA: entry |
| Species | Human | Mouse |
| Entrez | 1301 | 12814 |
| Ensembl | ENSG00000060718 | ENSMUSG00000027966 |
| UniProt | P12107 | Q61245 |
| RefSeq (mRNA) | NM_001190709; NM_001854; NM_080629; NM_080630 | NM_007729 |
| RefSeq (protein) | NP_001177638; NP_001845; NP_542196; NP_542197 | NP_031755 |
| Location (UCSC) | Chr 1: 102.88 – 103.11 Mb | Chr 3: 113.82 – 114.01 Mb |
| PubMed search |
- Wikidata
| View/Edit Human | View/Edit Mouse |

Collagen alpha-1(XI) chain is a protein that in humans is encoded by the COL11A1 gene.

== Function ==
The COL11A1 gene encodes one of the two alpha chains of type XI collagen, a minor fibrillar collagen. Type XI collagen is a heterotrimer but the third alpha chain is a post-translationally modified alpha 1 type II chain. Three transcript variants encoding different isoforms have been identified for this gene.

== Clinical significance ==
Mutations in this gene are associated with type II Stickler syndrome and with Marshall syndrome.

Stickler syndrome, type II is an autosomal dominant condition caused by a mutation in the COL11A1 gene. Features of Stickler syndrome type II include: sensorineural hearing loss, facial features (flat facial profile, anteverted nares, micrognathia), cleft palate, visual disturbances (type 2 vitreous anomaly, childhood-onset myopia, glaucoma, cataracts and retinal detachment), spondyloepiphyseal dysplasia, and arthropathy.
