= Haberman Feeder =

Specialty baby bottle

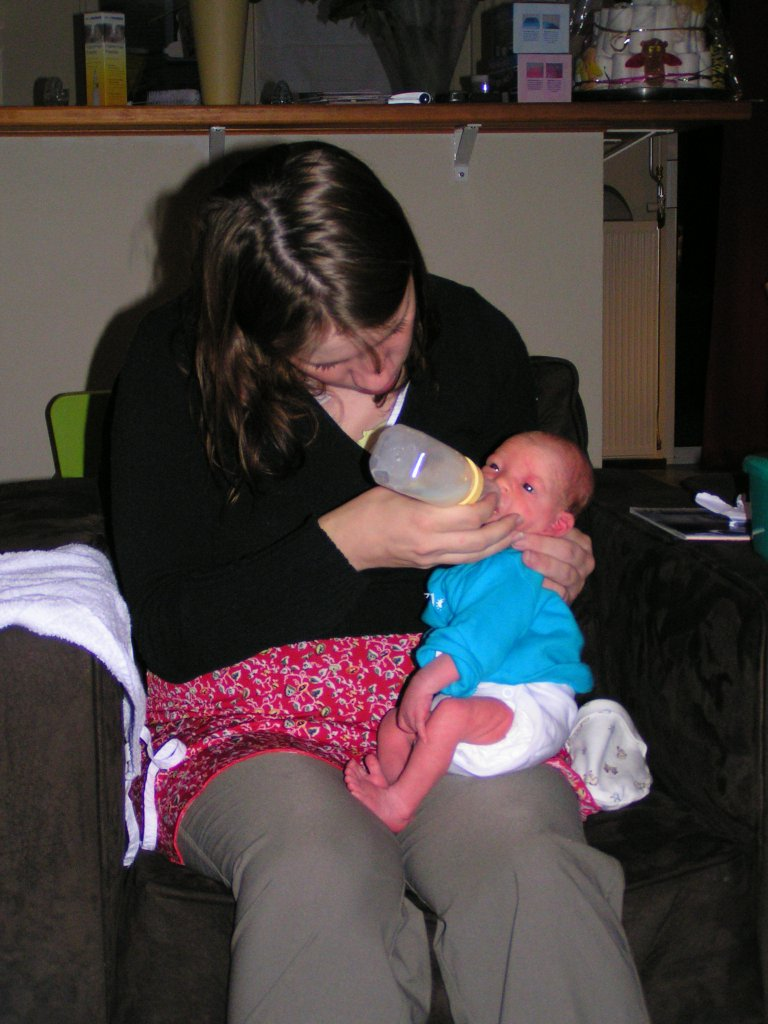
A baby being fed using the Haberman Feeder. The upright sitting position allows gravity to help the baby swallow the milk

The Haberman Feeder (a registered trademark) is a speciality bottle named after its inventor Mandy Haberman for babies with impaired sucking ability (for example due to cleft lip and palate or Mobius syndrome). The design of the feeder is to simulate breastfeeding.

== Origin ==
Mandy Haberman's research included contact with the Cleft Lip and Palate Association of Great Britain, and a study of cineradiographs of suckling infants, so that she might better comprehend the mechanics of feeding. She especially noted the differences between bottle feeding (which is primarily sucking) and breastfeeding (primarily pumping).

== How it works ==
The feeder's design enables the feeder to be activated by tongue and gum pressure, imitating the mechanics involved in breastfeeding, rather than by sucking. A one-way valve separates the nipple from the bottle. Before starting the feeding, air is squeezed out of the nipple and is automatically replaced by breastmilk or formula through the valve. Milk cannot flow back into the bottle and is replenished continuously as the baby feeds. A slit valve opening near the tip of the nipple shuts between jaw compressions, preventing the baby from being overwhelmed with milk. Stopping or reducing the flow of milk is controlled by rotation of the nipple in the baby's mouth. Usually the nipple is marked with lines that indicate zero flow, moderate flow, and maximum flow. For infants who need assistance with their feeding efforts, whoever's feeding the baby may apply a gentle pumping action to the body of the nipple.

The numbers in the cross section are listed below:

1. Teat, this part is inserted into the baby's mouth.
2. Teat, this part is used to gently squeeze the milk into the baby's mouth and to keep the teat filled with milk.
3. Flexible part of the valve. The milk in the teat cannot flow back into the bottle, thus when squeezed the milk flows into the baby's mouth, at the same time milk is sucked into the teat
4. Ring to keep the teat and valve on top of the bottle.
5. Standard sized babybottle (only top part shown).

== Patent information ==
United Kingdom patent GB2169210 covering the feeder was applied for on December 11, 1985 and granted on January 5, 1989.

United States patent US6102245A covering the feeder was applied for on October 18, 1996 and granted on August 15, 2000 2.
