= Sippy cup =

Drinking cup designed for toddlers

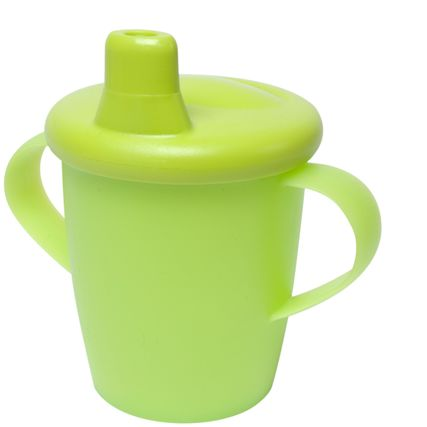
Typical sippy cup

The sippy cup, training cup (American English) or beaker (British English) is a modern drinking cup designed for toddlers that prevents or reduces spills. Sippy cups, as opposed to an open cup, have a top that prevents spills, and the child drinks through a spout. Some sippy cups work by way of surface tension that prevents liquid from being spilled even when the cup is upended, and others have valves. A sippy cup is typically an intermediary between the transition between the bottle or breast to a straw cup or open cup; however, some recommend skipping the sippy cup and transitioning directly to a straw cup or open cup.

== Invention ==
The Sipster spill-proof sippy cup was invented by Richard Belanger, who licensed the design to Playtex.

Belanger, who is credited with the invention of the modern sippy cup, invented his version of the sippy cup during the 1980s. Belanger, tired of cleaning up drink spills caused by his son, decided that he would solve the problem. Belanger was a mechanical engineer who had experience working with hot glue guns and thus knew how a nozzle worked. He created a prototype made of tupperware pieces and a mouth piece, and after experimenting with different mouth pieces (valves), he ended up with what is now recognized as the sippy cup.

For a few years before Belanger licensed the design to Playtex, he and his family sold sippy cups to friends and family right from their house.

== Usage ==
The sippy cup is used to transition young children from the baby bottle to a drinking cup without a lid. Although this cup may prevents spills, many dentists and professionals agree that prolonged use of the sippy cup can cause dental decay in children younger than 6.

== Types and parts ==
Modern day sippy cups and recent models differ from the original prototype by Richard Belanger. Sippy cups feature different types of spouts: hard spouts, soft spouts, and spoutless/natural spout. Sippy cups also come with or without handles and some offer removable handles so that the cup can be adapted to the user.

Hard Spouts: The spouts are made of hard plastic

Soft Spouts: This type of spouts are made of soft plastic, most commonly silicone.

Both types of spouts above require the user to tilt the cup upside down in order to drink from it.

Spoutless/Natural Spout: A type of spout that resembles a lid but allows the user to drink from it. This type of spout requires the user to tilt the cup to drink, when the cup is tiled upside down the "lid" seals so that the liquid is not spilled.

== Prehistoric counterparts ==
Archaeological findings across Europe of small clay vessels with nipple-like spouts suggest that a prehistoric version of the sippy cup was used in the Linear Pottery culture of the Neolithic period as early as c. 5,000 BCE, becoming more common through the Bronze Age until the early Iron Age. Initially, there was debate among researchers over whether the cups were used to nurse infants or were used for the sick and elderly. However, in the 1990s several cups from the Bronze Age and Iron Age were discovered in the graves of children, indicating that children as the intended users of such vessels. In 2019, a study was conducted on two vessels found in graves of an Iron Age cemetery complex dating c. 800 BCE – c. 450 BCE located in lower Altmühl valley in Bavaria. The graves belonged to children no older than 6. A further vessel, found in the cremation burial of a 1–2-year-old child from a late Bronze Age necropolis c. 1200 BCE – c. 800 BCE, located in the Augsburg-Haunstetten district of Bavaria, was also investigated.

Residues of animal milks were found in the vessels, not only providing further evidence that the cups were used for children and not the infirm, but also providing the first evidence for prehistoric infants being supplemented and weaned with animal milk. Previously, it had been thought that prehistoric infants had only been fed breast milk. Scientists are unsure if the presence of animal milk as opposed to breast milk contributed to the deaths of the children in the graves. Additionally, some of the vessels were shaped like animals, which Julie Dunne believes was simply to make children happy. Researchers further tested this theory by creating a recreation of one of the vessels, filling it with diluted apple sauce, and giving it to a 1-year-old toddler, who intuitively figured out how to suckle on the spout.

The presence of these artifacts implies a shift from a hunter-gatherer lifestyle to a more sedentary lifestyle with more reliable access to milk, as well as potentially having facilitated a baby boom with the ability to wean children off of breast milk earlier, allowing women to have children more frequently.
