= Breastfeeding contraindications =

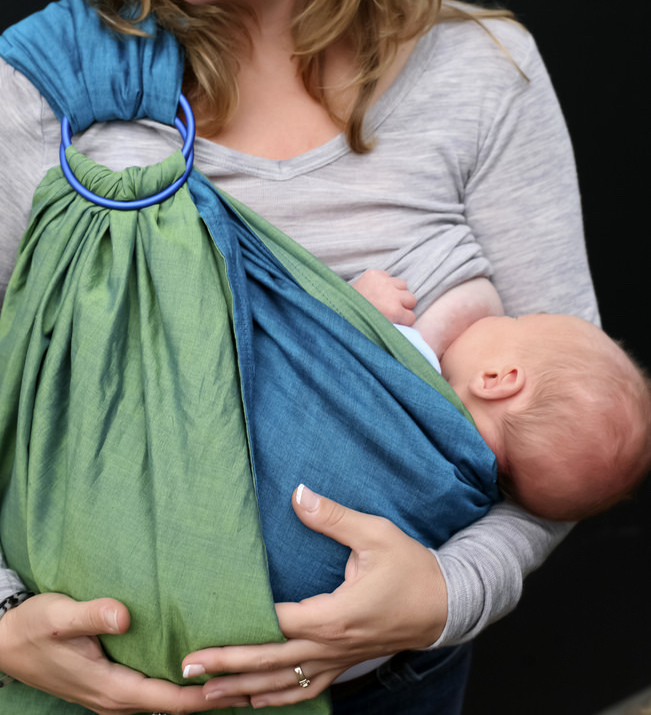

Contraindications to breastfeeding are those conditions that could compromise the health of the infant if breast milk from their mother is consumed. Examples include galactosemia, untreated HIV, untreated active tuberculosis, Human T-lymphotropic virus 1 or II, uses illicit drugs, or mothers undergoing chemotherapy or radiation treatment.

Breastfeeding contraindication are situations where the mother has conditions such as an addiction or disease that would make it harmful to the baby, should the baby be breastfed. Breast milk contains many nutrients that formulas in store shelves do not have which makes breast feeding a healthier and ideal way to feed an infant.^{[3]}

== Contraindications ==
Antenatal contraindications:

- Congenital diaphragmatic hernia
- Oesophageal atresia/tracheo-oesophageal fistula
- Intestinal obstruction
- Imperforate anus
- Gastroschisis/omphalocele
- Most Important – Galactosemia

Maternal contraindications:

- Mother on chemotherapy or recent/current use of radioactive agents
- Mother with human T-cell lymphotrophic viral infection, untreated brucellosis
- Mother having untreated (not yet sputum negative) open tuberculosis (but is still expressing breast milk and can feed)
- Excessive alcohol consumption
- Drug addiction
- Mother with suspected or untreated HIV.
- Most Important – Galactosemia

== T cell lymphotropic virus type 1 and 2 ==
An individual with T cell lymphotropic virus type 1 and 2 will have excessive amounts of T-cell leukemia and HTLV-1. This often happens through the spread of needles and can affect anyone at any age. If a mother contains this virus and is not aware of it the spread to her infant can be at an all-time high of 25%. There is currently no antivirals a mother can take to decrease the spread which is why breastfeeding is not recommended.

== Alcohol ==
If a mother is binge drinking while breastfeeding there is a risk of slow weight gain for the infant. Alcohol interferes with the milk ejection reflex, which may ultimately reduce milk production through inadequate breast emptying. Human milk alcohol levels generally parallel maternal blood alcohol levels, and studies evaluating infant effects of maternal alcohol consumption have been mostly mixed, with some mild effects seen in infant sleep patterns, amount of milk consumed during breastfeeding sessions, and early psychomotor development.
