= Gunnar B. Stickler =

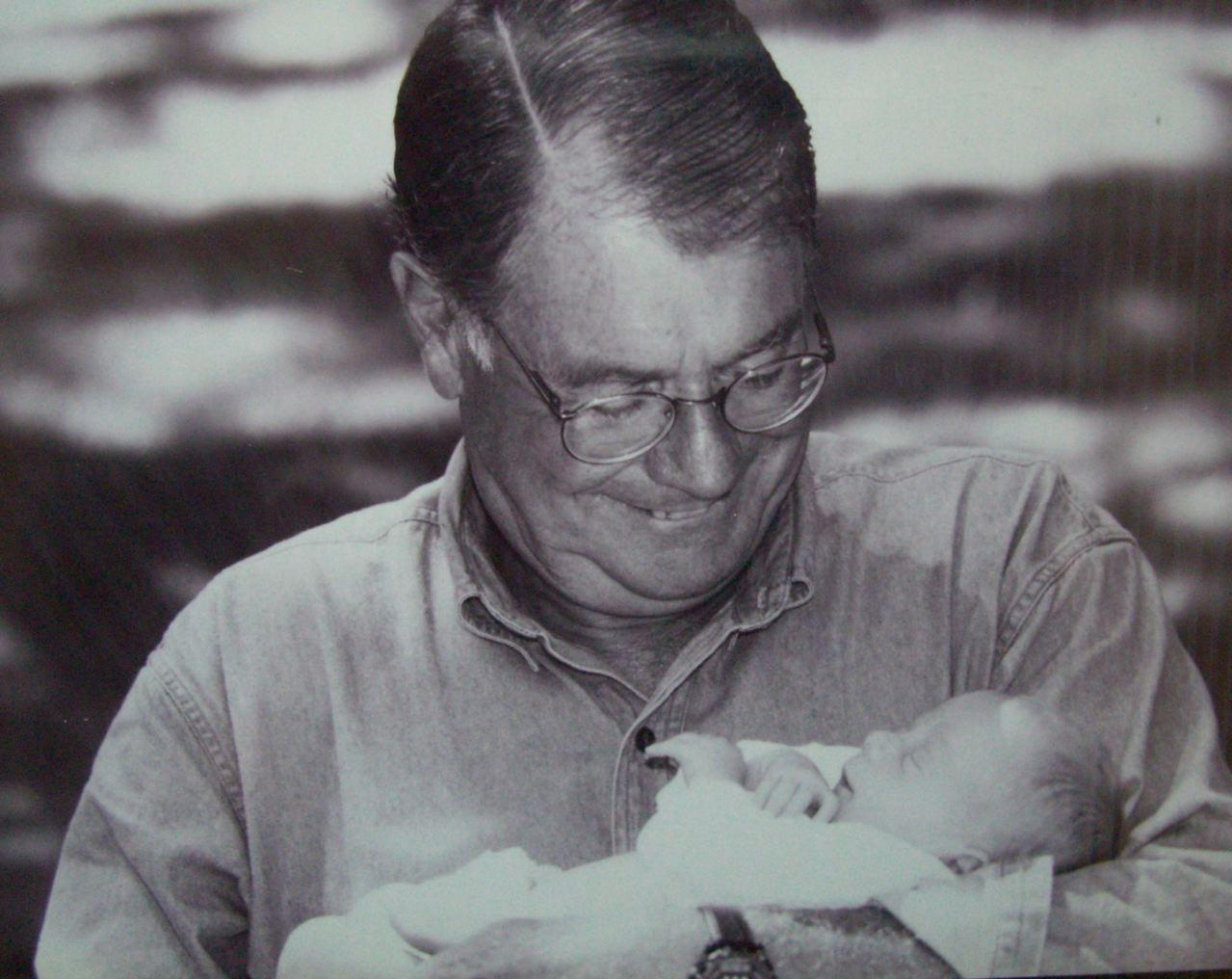
- Gunnar B. Stickler with his granddaughter
- Born: June 13, 1925; Peterskirchen, Germany
- Died: November 4, 2010 (aged 85); Minneapolis, Minnesota
- Education: Wilhelmsgymnasium
- Occupation: pediatrician
- Known for: The first scientist to describe Stickler syndrome
- Medical career
- Profession: Research scientist
- Sub-specialties: Pediatrics

Gunnar B. Stickler (13 June 1925 – 4 November 2010) was a pediatrician who made substantial contributions to the field of pediatrics. He was the first scientist to describe a hereditary condition now known as Stickler syndrome.

== Early life ==
Gunnar B. Stickler was born June 13, 1925, in Peterskirchen, Germany and died on November 4, 2010, in Minneapolis, Minnesota, US. He attended the Wilhelmsgymnasium (Munich), Germany. Beginning in 1944, he studied medicine at the universities of Vienna, Erlangen and Munich. After graduation in 1949, he spent one year in clinical pathology and one in pathologic anatomy in Munich. In 1951 he emigrated to the US after being accepted for an internship at the Mountainside Hospital, Montclair, New Jersey, and subsequently for a fellowship in pediatrics at the Mayo Clinic.

== Career ==
From 1953-56 he was a senior cancer research scientist at Roswell Park Comprehensive Cancer Center in Buffalo, New York. In July 1958, he was appointed to the Staff of the Mayo Clinic in pediatrics. He was elected to the Society for Pediatric Research in 1962; he later served as the President of the Midwest Society for Pediatric Research. In 1967 he was named an official examiner of the American Board of Pediatrics. He advanced in academic rank to Professor of Pediatrics in 1969; in November 1969 he was named Chair of the Section of Pediatrics. The Section was later named the Department of Pediatrics under Doctor Stickler's leadership in 1974 when Mayo Clinic combined the Sections of Pediatrics and Pediatric Cardiology, when the Chair of the Section of Pediatric Cardiology James DuShane retired. Under his leadership, the Department pursued the establishment a neonatal intensive care unit and an adolescent unit at Saint Marys Hospital as well as clerkships in the new Mayo Medical School. Doctor Stickler served on the Admissions Committee and the Medical School Coordinators Committee. Doctor Stickler also advanced primary pediatric care at Mayo Clinic as well as developed the subspecialty practices and pediatric research efforts at Mayo Clinic. He completed his term as Chair of the Department on March 31, 1980, and retired in the fall of 1989. He died unexpectedly at home from a stroke on November 4, 2010.

== Stickler Syndrome ==
In 1960, a twelve-year-old boy was examined at a Crippled Children Clinic in Faribault, Minnesota, which at the time was staffed by members of the Mayo Clinic. The boy had bony enlargements of several joints and was extremely short sighted. His mother was totally blind. Dr Stickler discovered that there were other members of the family with similar symptoms. This prompted him to study the family. With colleagues he collaborated to define the condition, the results were published in June 1965. He tentatively named the condition hereditary progressive arthro-ophthalmopathy. Since the 1980s, this condition has become to be known as Stickler syndrome. Throughout the years that followed he worked with patient-support groups such as the U.S. support group, Stickler Involved People, to help improve awareness of the syndrome and the need for early and expert intervention.

== Other Accomplishments ==
Besides the landmark paper on hereditary progressive arthro-ophthalmopathy he has authored or co-authored some 200 scientific papers. He published a landmark paper published in Pediatrics in 1965 with Edward O'Connell and Robert Feldt on the importance of small head circumference and its association with intellectual disability and short stature. He conducted a number of treatment trials of otitis media; this body of work eventually resulted in four publications and represented the first controlled treatment trial of otitis media in the United States. He has published extensively on pediatric nephrology, his chosen sub-speciality, and as well as a range of other pediatric problems from cyclic vomiting syndrome to parental worries.
