= Breast milk-mediated drug delivery =

Drug delivery mechanism

Breast milk-mediated drug delivery refers to the use of breast milk to transport a pharmaceutical compound, protein, or other treatment to achieve a desired effect. Delivery of these substances via milk provides an oral alternative for transport of a compound to the gut, specifically in infants. Breast milk-mediated drug delivery provides a way for pharmaceuticals and proteins to travel through the gastrointestinal system of an infant while minimizing the potential for irritation within gastrointestinal tissue.

== Addition of compounds into breast milk ==
There are multiple routes that a treatment can enter into the breast milk. One route is through a breastfeeding mother. When a mother that is lactating receives a treatment including but not limited to prescription medication, over-the-counter medications, or herbal remedies, these compounds can make their way into the mother’s milk and are subsequently delivered to an infant via breastfeeding. The amount of treatment transferred into the milk depends on the substance, but it is noted that these compounds can have an effect on the infant consuming the breast milk.

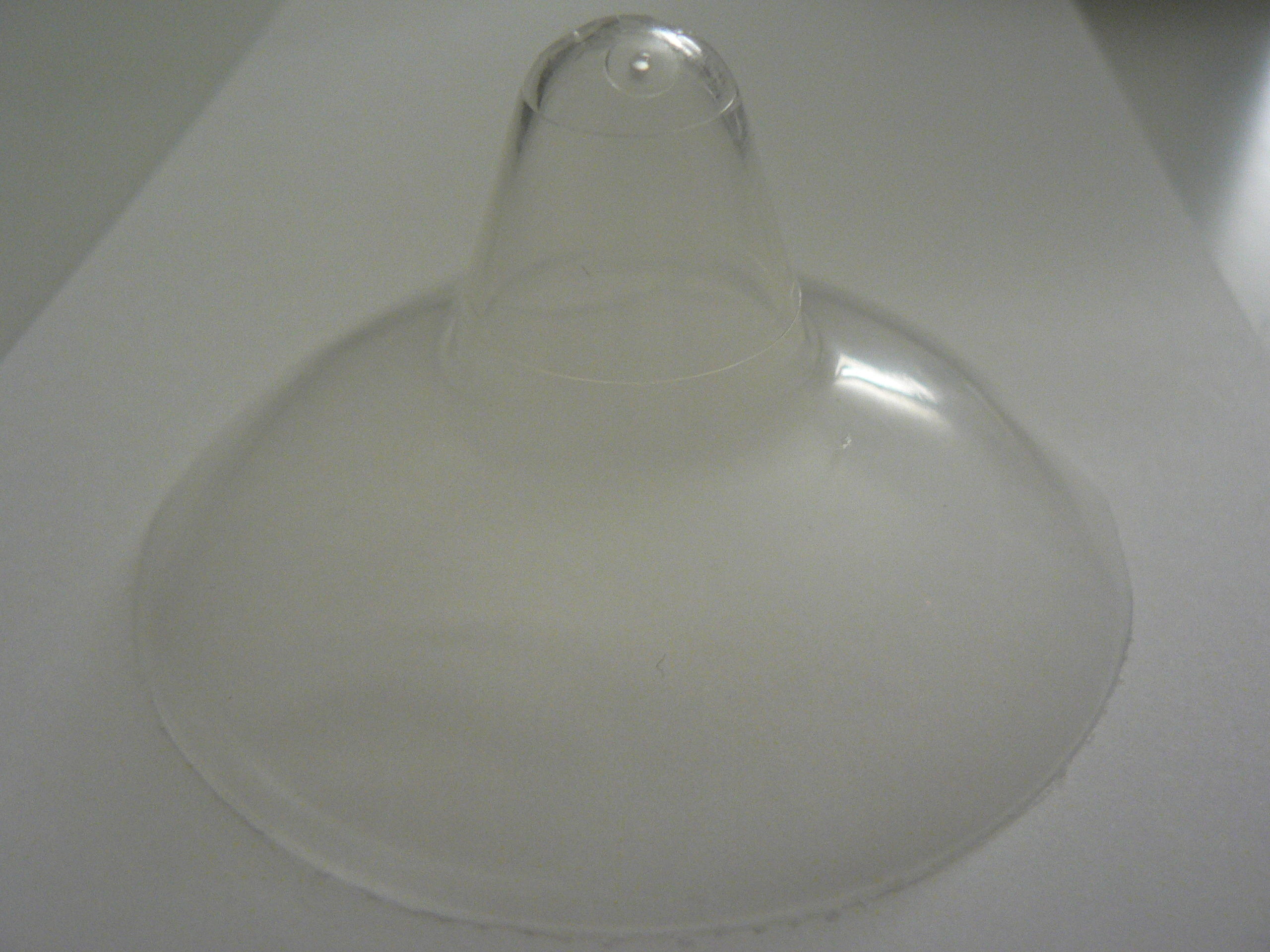
A silicone nipple shield that could be loaded with a pharmaceutical compound

A common method for intended addition of treatment into breast milk involves the use of donor breast milk in combination with the compound of interest for treatment. Addition of antibiotics, oligosaccharides, cytokines, or selected proteins into donor breast milk for consumption can have a variety of effects on the patient consuming it, typically an infant. This method has also been studied for use in adults, specifically for the delivery of poorly water-soluble drugs. While this method allows for the highest level of modularity among breast milk treatments, the effects of these treatments on various factors such as the microbiome of the milk base must be acknowledged to limit potential side effects.

Other novel technologies for drug delivery via breast milk involve the use of external objects to mediate the addition of compounds into the milk being consumed. One of these technologies is a nipple shield. A nipple shield is placed onto the nipple of a breastfeeding mother, releasing treatment into the milk as the mother breastfeeds an infant. Many of these novel technologies still require testing for efficacy and safety before any potential commercial application.

== Potential applications ==
=== Breast milk fortification ===
Breast milk fortification refers to the addition of nutrients such as proteins, oligosaccharides, or cytokines into breast milk to supplement the natural contents of the milk. This practice is common in babies that have been born prematurely, with a major goal of this practice being growth promotion. These infants do not receive enough nutrients for proper growth and development from a normal breastfeeding regimen, potentially leading to neural and/or cognitive impairment. Thus, supplementation of breast milk with proteins, calcium, phosphate, and other nutrients can help to remedy this issue.

Studies have shown that human milk fortification can improve the short-term growth of infants, though future research is needed to determine long term growth effects. There is variation with results from case to case, however. The nonstandard concentration of proteins across different mothers’ breast milk can lead to issues when pinpointing the amount of nutrients an infant is receiving. While there is a standard fortification level used in most cases, “Adjustable Fortification and “Targeted Fortification” are being researched as ways to provide targeted individual fortification to suit the needs of each individual being treated.

One particular compound that can be used to fortify breast milk is Human Milk Oligosaccharide. These prebiotics are found naturally in human breast milk, and provide a variety of health benefits to newborns, including modulation of the immune system, fighting viral infections, and promoting epithelial cell maturation. These prebiotics, which have been confirmed to be safe and tolerable for infants, are a leading candidate for breast milk fortification.

=== Antibiotic addition ===
Antibiotics can be added into breast milk as a preventative measure for the development of infections such as Subsequent Late Onset Sepsis and Necrotizing Enterocolitis. Antibiotic treatment is a very common treatment for premature babies, though dosing regimen and treatment length tend to be “arbitrary”. While potentially detrimental to the health of the gut microbiome if given in excess, the administration of antibiotics within breast milk can help to prevent infection in newborns.

Antibiotics are used as the most common treatment for prematurely born infants in Neonatal Intensive Care Units – used as a preventative measure for infection. These treatments usually contain empirical antibiotics and are often given to infants that do not show signs of bacterial infection. Studies are currently being performed to determine the optimal length of treatment for infants to prevent infection while maintaining gut health, specifically in the microbiome.

Stability of milk-drug formulations is another factor that contributes to the effectiveness of antibiotic addition into breast milk. Many orally delivered antibiotics show poor solubility in aqueous environments, leading to increased research into lipid-based drug delivery systems. Milk formulations, which contain varying levels of natural lipids, have been shown to increase delivery efficacy of antibiotic compounds, while maintaining stability and integrity of the colloidal structure that makes up milk.

=== Prevention of necrotizing enterocolitis ===
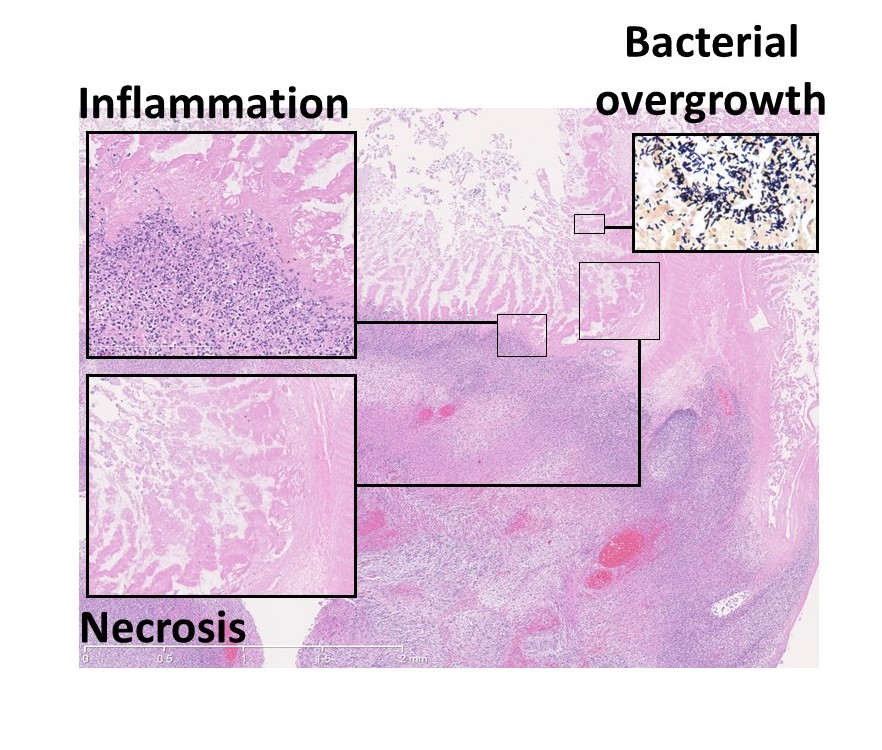
Depiction of Necrotizing Enterocolitis Histopathology

Addition of carefully selected compounds into breast milk have been shown to not only stimulate growth within an infant, but also help to prevent infections from forming, specifically in the gut. Babies born very prematurely are at high risk for these infections, particularly necrotizing enterocolitis. Necrotizing enterocolitis is an intestinal condition that develops in some premature babies, and is characterized by inflammation, bacterial infection, potential intestinal injury, and in extreme cases, death.

The development of necrotizing enterocolitis has also been linked to the microbiome of the gut in the affected population. High levels of antibiotic administration have been shown to reduce the variety of bacteria present within the gut microbiome, and this lower level of diversity found in these infants can increase their susceptibility to necrotizing enterocolitis. Studies have indicated that time of administration of antibiotics as well as type of antibiotic can impact the incidence of the condition.

Prevention of necrotizing enterocolitis in premature infants is mainly achieved through the addition of predetermined compounds into donor breast milk that is fed to premature infants at risk for the condition. Compounds such as immunoglobulins have been shown to reduce Necrotizing Enterocolitis incidence, as well as severity in those that still develop the condition. Studies have shown that the addition of IgA and IgG into a premature infant’s feed can lower the incidence of the disease in the population of infants that are at the highest risk for the condition (very premature, low birth weight).

== Problems ==
One of the main issues surrounding breast milk-mediated drug delivery is the uncertainty of the composition of the milk acting as the vessel for the treatment. Since every breastfeeding mother experiences different external conditions such as diet and environment, as well as differences in genetics, breast milk from every mother will have a different composition, making it difficult to create replicable treatments from infant to infant. Donor breast milk encounters this same issue, with infant formula acting as a potential avenue for stabilization of treatment levels.

Improper administration of antibiotics into an infant’s gastrointestinal system can increase the susceptibility of infants to gut infections. This is due to the lowered diversity and viability of organisms found within the gut, also known as the microbiome. Especially prevalent in preterm infants, this deviation from a healthy microbiome can lead to adverse effects during the beginning of an infant’s life. These infants may be predisposed to conditions such as Necrotizing Enterocolitis due to higher growth of pathogenic bacteria within the gut, as well as a lower count of commensal bacteria growth.

== Future prospects ==
New breast milk-mediated therapies are still in development, aiming to take advantage of properties that are unique to this form of treatment. One such technology is the use of exosomes found in milk to transport molecules such as mRNA, DNA, and proteins to an area of interest. This research proposes the use of milk, as a scalable source of exosomes for a method of targeted drug delivery with higher efficacy than standard oral methods. These novel therapies may provide a way to achieve a low-cost method to deliver drugs with poor water solubility into the body, with potential use as a low-cost alternative.

== See also ==
- Breast milk
- Breastfeeding and medications
- Human milk bank
- Drug delivery
- Food fortification
- Necrotizing enterocolitis
