= Nipple shield =

Nipple shield may refer to:

- Nipple shield (breastfeeding), a temporary protective sheath worn during breastfeeding
- Breast shells, which protect nipples from being flattened in preparation for breastfeeding
- Pasties, a nipple covering for fashion purposes
