= Milk cup (disambiguation) =

A milk cup or breast shell is a hollow, lightweight plastic disk worn inside the brassiere to help correct a flat or inverted nipple.

Milk cup may also refer to:

- SuperCupNI, an international youth football tournament formerly known as Milk Cup or Dale Farm Milk Cup
- EFL Cup, an English football competition known as the Milk Cup during its sponsorship with the Milk Marketing Board between 1982 and 1986
