= Inverted nipple =

- Other names: Invaginated nipple
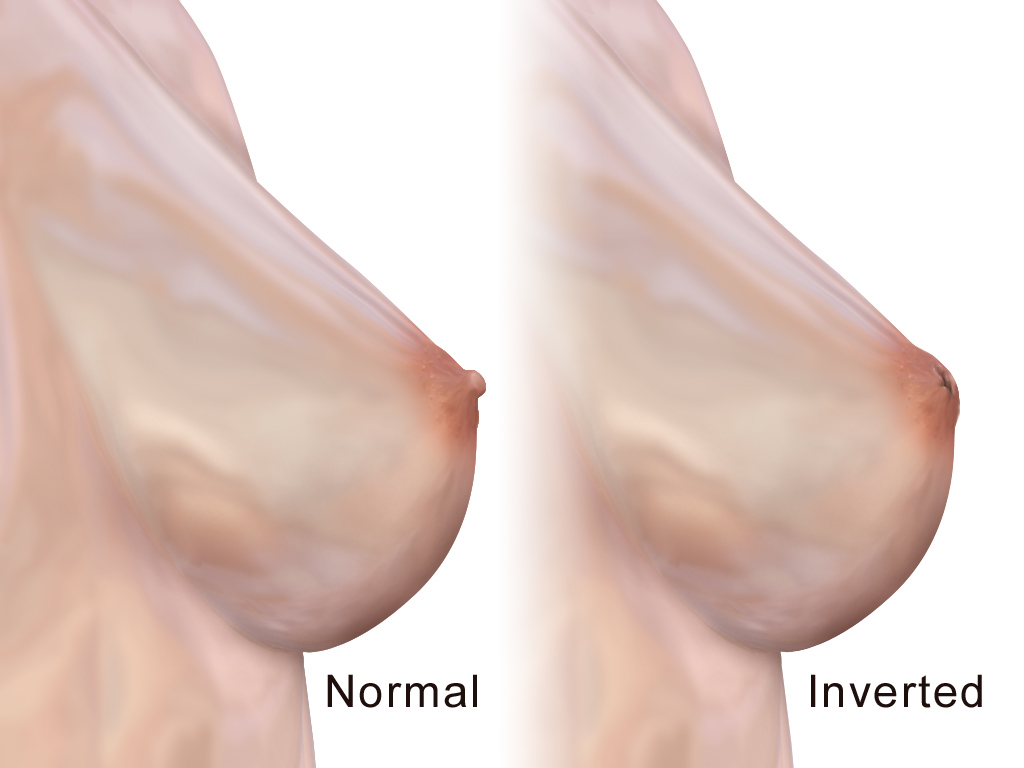
- Inverted versus normal nipple
- Specialty: Gynecology

An inverted nipple (occasionally invaginated nipple) is a condition where the nipple, instead of pointing outward, is retracted into the breast. In some cases, the nipple will be temporarily protruded if stimulated. Both women and men can have inverted nipples.

== Causes ==
Common causes of nipple inversion include:

- Inborn
- Trauma caused by conditions such as fat necrosis, scars, or surgery
- Breast sagging, drooping or ptosis
- Breast cancer
  - Breast carcinoma
  - Paget's disease
  - Inflammatory breast cancer
- Breast infections or inflammations
  - Mammary duct ectasia
  - Breast abscess
  - Mastitis
- Genetic variation, such as:
  - Weaver syndrome
  - Congenital disorder of glycosylation type 1A and 1 L
  - Kennerknecht-Sorgo-Oberhoffer syndrome
- Gynecomastia
- Recurrent infection
- Tuberculosis

Most common inborn nipple variations are caused by short ducts or a wide areola muscle sphincter.

Inverted nipples can also occur after sudden and major weight loss.

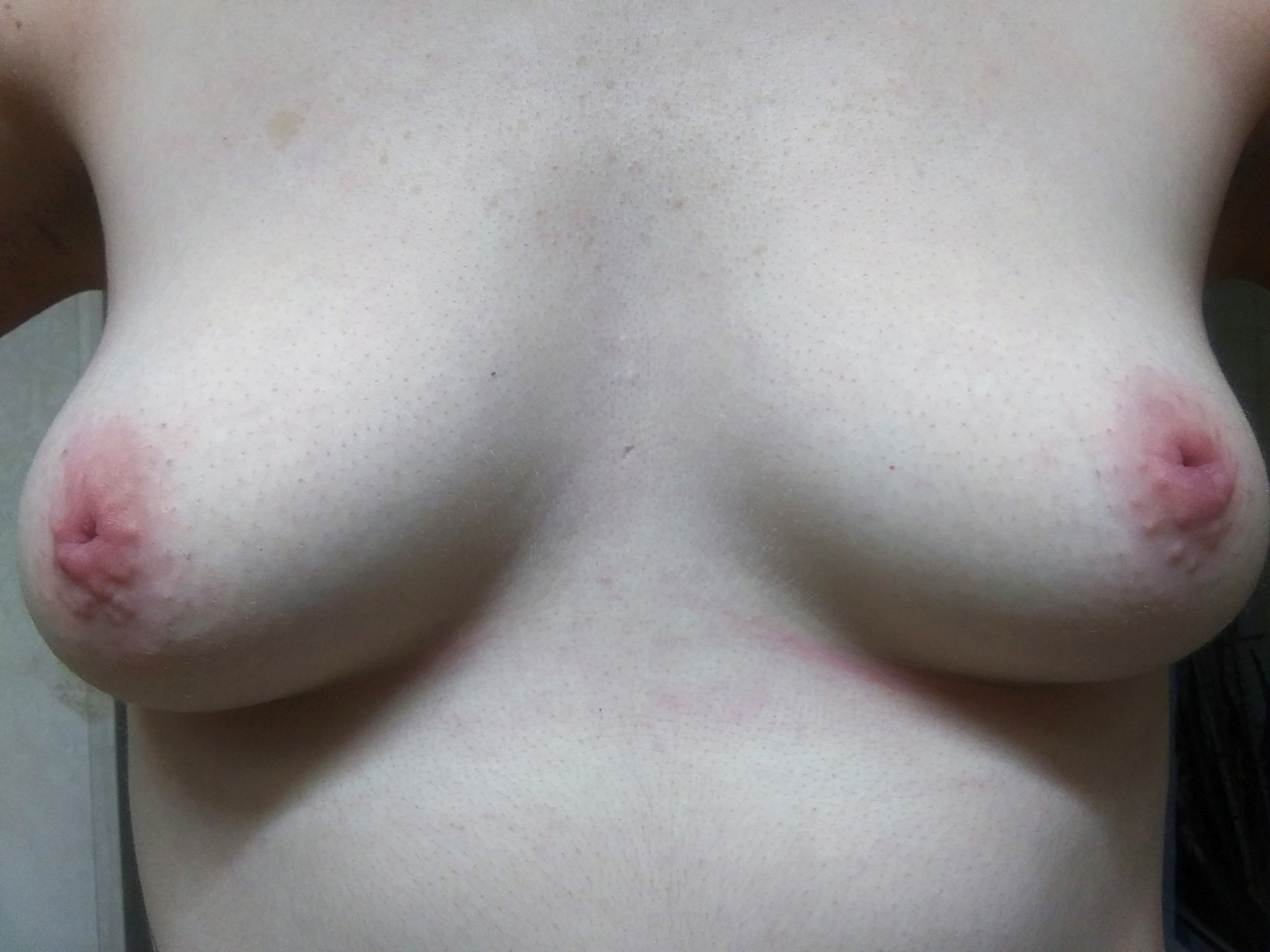
Grade-3 inverted nipples of a 23-year-old female.

== Grading system ==
The three grades of inverted nipples are defined on how easily the nipple may be protracted and the degree of fibrosis existent in the breast, as well as the damage it has caused on the milk ducts.

Inverted nipple grade 1 refers to nipples that can easily be pulled out, by using finger pressure around the areola. The grade-1 inverted nipple maintains its projections and rarely retracts. Also, grade-1 inverted nipples may occasionally pop up without manipulation or pressure. Milk ducts are usually not compromised and breast feeding is possible. These are "shy nipples". It is believed to have minimal or no fibrosis. There is no soft-tissue deficiency of the nipple. The lactiferous duct should be normal without any retraction.

Inverted nipple grade 2 is the nipple which can be pulled out, though not as easily as the grade 1, but which retracts after pressure is released. Breast feeding is usually possible, though it is more likely to be hard to get the baby to latch comfortably in the first weeks after birth; extra help may be needed. Grade 2 nipples have a moderate degree of fibrosis. The lactiferous ducts are mildly retracted, but do not need to be cut for the release of fibrosis. On histological examination, these nipples have rich collagenous stromata with numerous bundles of smooth muscle.

Inverted nipple grade 3 describes a severely inverted and retracted nipple which can rarely be pulled out physically and which requires surgery to be protracted. Milk ducts are often constricted, and breast feeding is difficult, but not necessarily impossible. With good preparation and help, babies often can drink at the breast, and milk production is not affected; after breastfeeding, nipples often are less or no longer inverted. Women with grade-3 inverted nipples may also struggle with infections, rashes, or problems with nipple hygiene. The fibrosis is remarkable and lactiferous ducts are short and severely retracted. The bulk of soft tissue is markedly insufficient in the nipple. Histologically, atrophic terminal duct lobular units and severe fibrosis are seen.

== Pregnancy and breastfeeding ==
Women with inverted nipples may find that their nipples protract (come out) temporarily or permanently during pregnancy, or as a result of breastfeeding. Most women with inverted nipples who give birth are able to breastfeed without complication, but inexperienced mothers may experience higher than average pain and soreness when initially attempting to breastfeed. When a mother uses proper breastfeeding technique, the infant latches onto the areola, not the nipple, so women with inverted nipples are actually able to breastfeed without any problem. An infant that latches on well may be able to slush out an inverted nipple. The use of a breast pump or other suction device immediately before a feeding may help to draw out inverted nipples. A hospital grade electric pump may be used for this purpose. Some women also find that using a nipple shield can help facilitate breastfeeding. Frequent stimulation such as sexual intercourse and foreplay (such as nipple sucking) also helps the nipple protract.

== Other corrective strategies ==
Other strategies for protracting inverted nipples include regularly stimulating the nipples to a protruding state, in an attempt to gradually loosen the nipple tissue. Some sex toys designed for nipple stimulation, such as suction cups or clamps, may also cause inverted nipples to protract or stay protracted longer. Some special devices are specifically designed to draw out inverted nipples, or a home-made nipple protractor can be constructed out of a 10-ml disposable syringe. These methods are often used in preparation for breastfeeding, which can sometimes cause inverted nipples to become protracted permanently.

One method which is now discouraged is the use of breast shells. Breast shells may be used to apply gentle constant pressure to the areola to try to break any adhesions under the skin that are preventing the nipple from being drawn out. The shells are worn inside the bra. Although it may be promoted, a 1992 study found that not only do shells not promote more successful breastfeeding, but they may also actually disrupt it.
