= Breastfeeding and medications =

Breastfeeding and medications is the description of the medications that can be used by a breastfeeding mother, and the balance between maternal health and the safety of the breastfeeding infant. Medications, when administered to breastfeeding mothers, almost always are transferred to breast milk, albeit usually in small quantities. The degree of impact on the nursing infant varies, with many medications posing minimal risk. Nonetheless, informed decision-making and professional guidance is needed.

The National Institutes of Health (NIH) maintains a database, which contains information on drugs and other chemicals to which breastfeeding mothers may be exposed. It includes information on the levels of such substances in breast milk and infant blood, and the possible adverse effects in the nursing infant. Suggested therapeutic alternatives to those drugs are provided, where appropriate.

Some medications and herbal supplements can be of concern. This can be because the drug can accumulate in breastmilk or have effects on the infant and the mother. Those medications of concern are those medications used to treat substance and alcohol addiction. Other medications of concern are those that are used in smoking cessation. Pain medications, such as opioids among others, and antidepressants need evaluation.

== Evaluating the potential for adverse effects ==
The determination of the safety of a medication can be evaluated by considering the following:

- If and how much of the drug is present in breastmilk.
- The age and maturity of the infant. Full term infants are better able to metabolize medications than premature infants.
- The weight of the infant.
- The amount and percentage of breastmilk consumed by the infant. An infant taking solid foods with breastfeeding will receive a lower dose of medication.
- The general health of the infant and the general health of the mother.
- The nature of the mother's illness, if present.
- The general information about the drug other literature documenting studies related to the drug and breastfeeding.
- The duration of the drug therapy.
- Is the drug short-acting? A short-acting form of the drug may be a better choice for a breastfeeding mother rather than a longer-acting form that stays in the mother's system for a longer period.
- How is the medication being given?
- Does the drug interfere with lactation?

== Lactation risk categories ==
Drugs can be categorised in one of five categories to determine how safe they are for breastfeeding:

=== L1 Compatible ===
"Drug which has been taken by a large number of breastfeeding mothers without any observed increase in adverse effects in the infant. Controlled studies in breastfeeding women fail to demonstrate a risk to the infant and the possibility of harm to the breastfeeding infant is remote; or the product is not orally bioavailable in an infant."

=== L2 Probably Compatible ===
"Drug which has been studied in a limited number of breastfeeding women without an increase in adverse effects in the infant. And/or, the evidence of a demonstrated risk which is likely to follow use of this medication in a breastfeeding woman is remote."

=== L3 Probably Compatible ===
"There are no controlled studies in breastfeeding women, however the risk of untoward effects to a breastfed infant is possible; or, controlled studies show only minimal non-threatening adverse effects. Drugs should be given only if the potential benefit justifies the potential risk to the infant. (New medications that have absolutely no published data are automatically categorized in this category, regardless of how safe they may be.)"

=== L4 Possibly Hazardous ===
"There is positive evidence of risk to a breastfed infant or to breastmilk production, but the benefits of use in breastfeeding mothers may be acceptable despite the risk to the infant (e.g. if the drug is needed in a life-threatening situation or for a serious disease for which safer drugs cannot be used or are ineffective)."

=== L5 Hazardous ===
"Studies in breastfeeding mothers have demonstrated that there is significant and documented risk to the infant based on human experience, or it is a medication that has a high risk of causing significant damage to an infant. The risk of using the drug in breastfeeding women clearly outweighs any possible benefit from breastfeeding. The drug is contraindicated in women who are breastfeeding an infant."

== Over the counter medications ==
Over the counter medications are those medications that do not require a prescription to purchase in the US. Medications that require a prescription to purchase in the US may be available in other countries without a prescription. The following guidelines are recommended:

- taking oral medications after breastfeeding rather than before will allow some of the medication to leave the mother's body through her kidneys between nursings.
- in most women without kidney disease, nonsteroidal anti-inflammatory drugs and paracetamol (acetaminophen) are used safely.
- aspirin can cause rashes and even cause bleeding in infants.
- limit the use of antihistamines for long periods of time. These anti-allergy medications can cause crying, sleep problems, fussiness, excessive sleepiness in babies. Antihistamines have an effect on the amount of milk the body produces and decrease the supply.
- carefully observe the infant for changes or side effects when first taking a medication to watch for side effects. Side effects indicating that the medication is having an effect on the baby is difficulty breathing, rash and other questionable changes that occurred after the medication was started by the mother.
- many times other young children are in the home and keeping these over the counter medications out of their reach is a safe practice.

Other substances or chemicals have been evaluated regarding their safe use during pregnancy. Hair dye or solutions used for a 'permanent' do not pass to breastmilk. No adverse reports of using oral antihistamines and breastfeeding are found. Some of the older antihistamines used by a nursing mother can cause drowsiness in the infant. This may be a concern if the infant misses feedings by sleeping instead of nursing.
