= Breast shell =

Treatment for inverted nipples

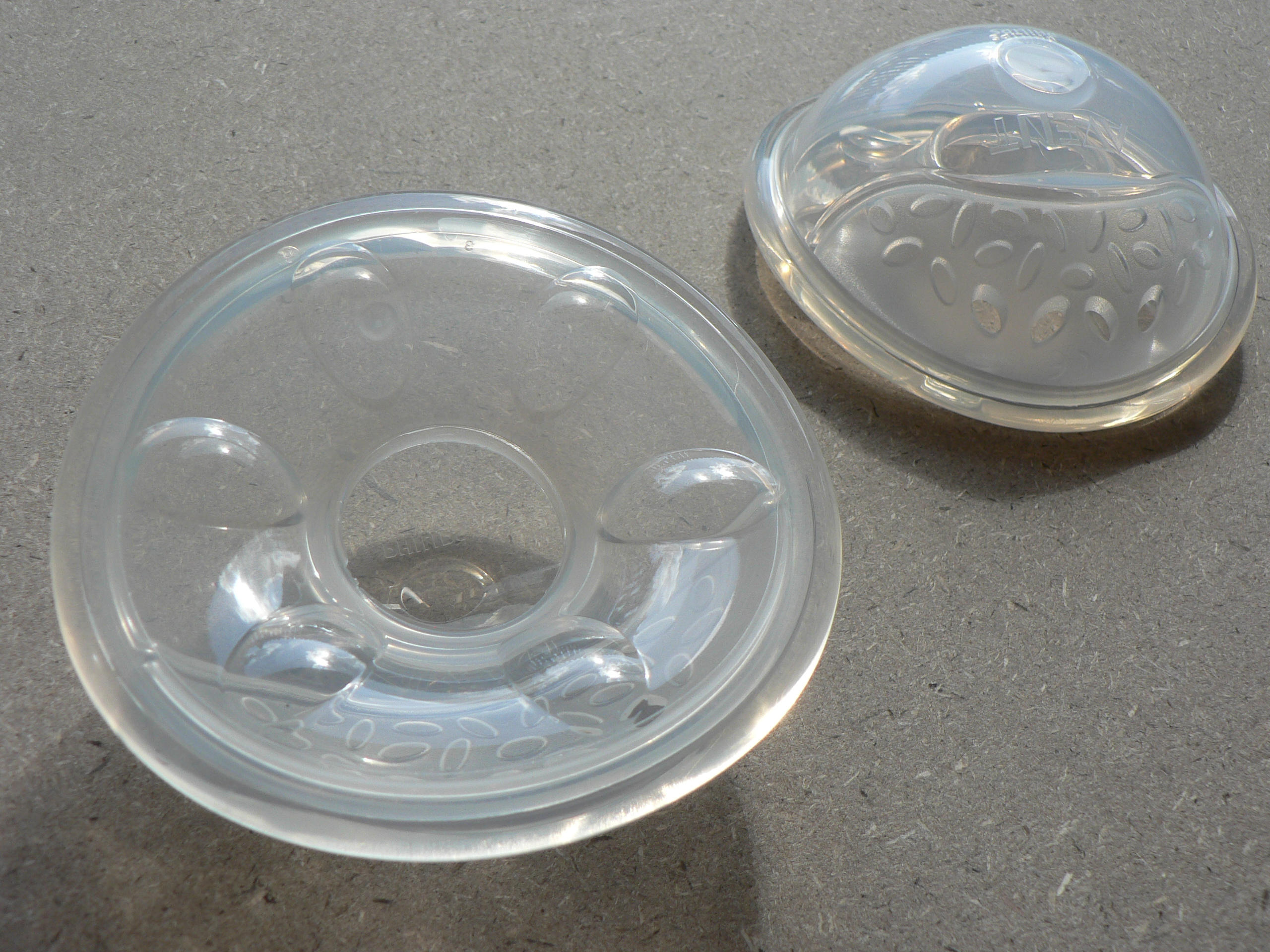

Breast shells are hollow, lightweight plastic disks worn inside the brassiere to help correct flat or inverted nipples either in preparation for or during breastfeeding. Also known as milk cups, breast cups, breast shields, san belts, or Woolwich shields, they can also be used to ease sensitive nipples or collect milk when the baby has not finished the teat. Breast shells function by applying gentle but firm pressure to the region surrounding the nipple to stretch underlying adhesions and draw out the nipple. Nipple shields may be confused with breast shells, but shields are intended for use during the act of breastfeeding, whereas breast shells are worn in preparation for or after breastfeeding.

== Usage ==
A breast shell is composed of inner and outer sections which snap together and enclose the nipple. The inner section, which encircles the nipple and puts pressure on the surrounding breast tissue, is often lined with soft material such as silicone. The rigid outer section separates the nipple from the bra and clothing and leaves open a space which can collect milk.

If the shell is used to help ready the mother for breastfeeding, this is best done during pregnancy because the shell can increase leaking of breast milk or colostrum. On the other hand, some wear breast shells to collect leaking milk while nursing the baby on the other breast. If worn to correct inverted or flat nipples, the shells are typically worn during the third trimester for up to 10 hours daily as the mother's comfort dictates.

== Criticism ==
Some research suggests that breast shells used on inverted nipples may either hinder or have no effect on the mother's ability to breastfeed successfully. One study of women with inverted or non-protractile nipples found no statistically significant difference in breastfeeding success between using breast shields and doing nothing.

== See also ==
- Pasties
- Nipple shield (breastfeeding)
