= Nipple shield (breastfeeding) =

Temporary protective sheath

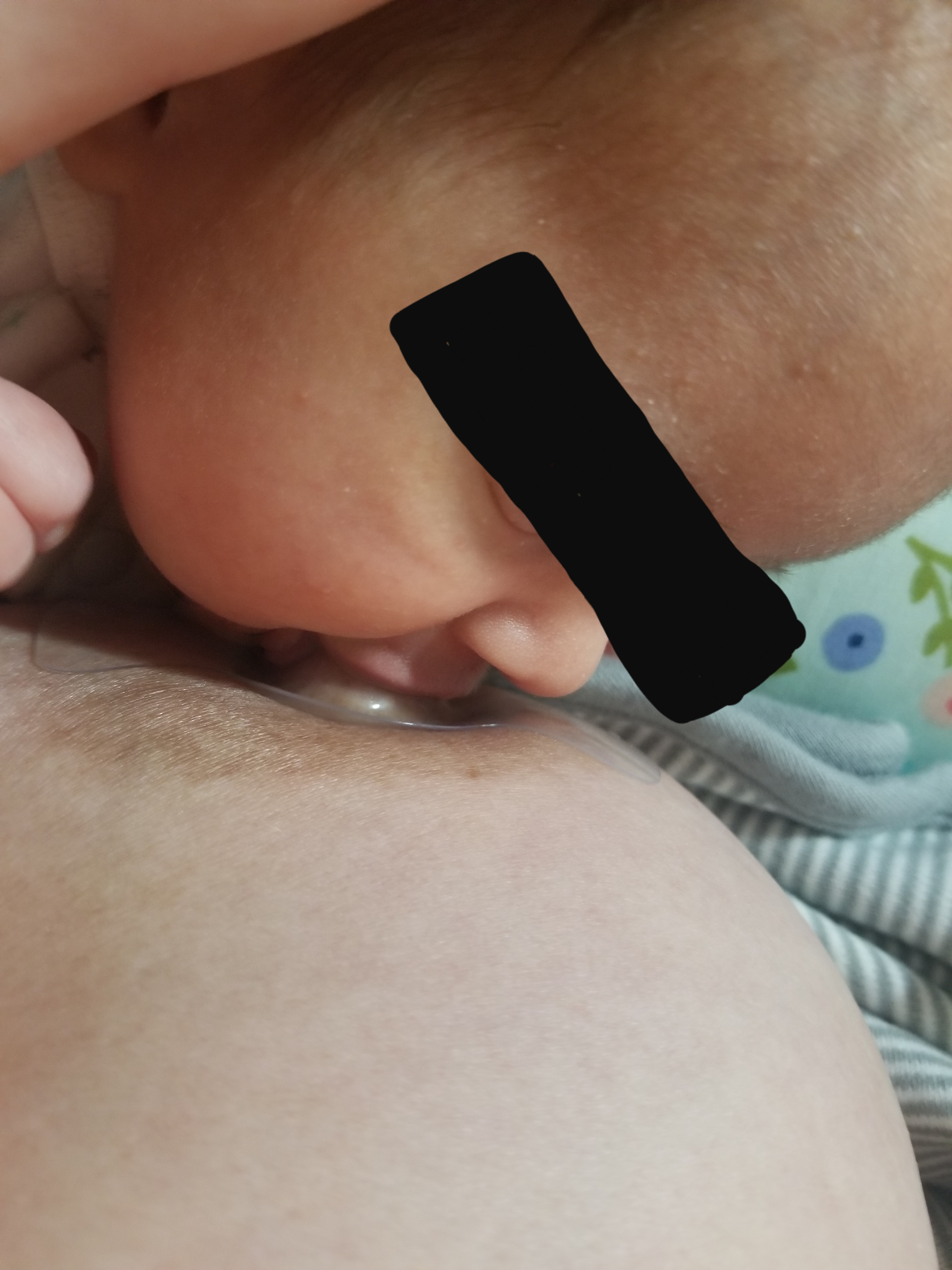
Infant latched on to nipple with nipple shield

A nipple shield is a nipple-shaped sheath worn over the areola and nipple during breastfeeding. Modern nipple shields are made of soft, thin, flexible silicone and have holes at the end of the nipple section to allow the breast milk to pass through.

== History ==
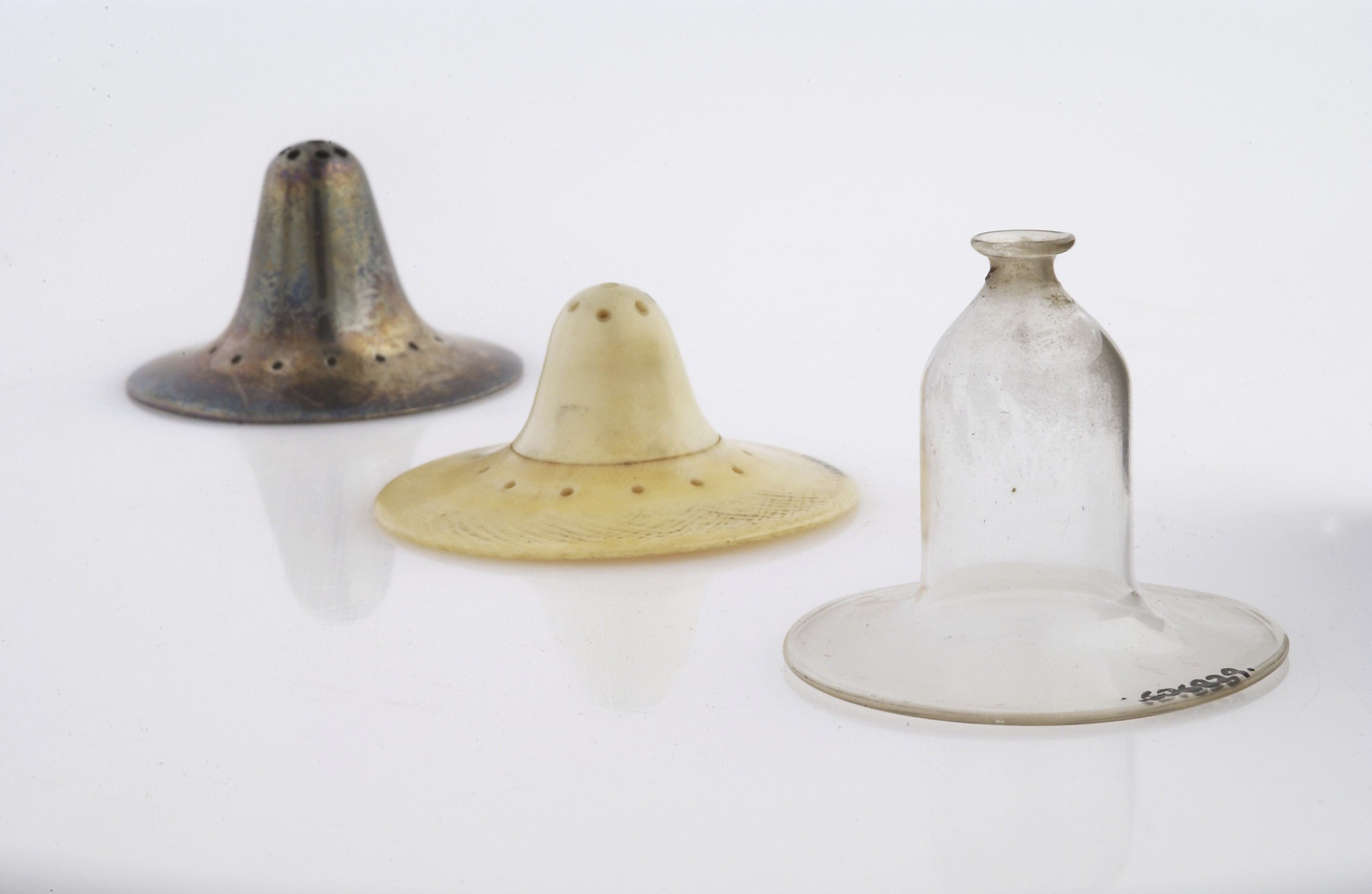
Sterling silver, ivory, and glass nipple shields.

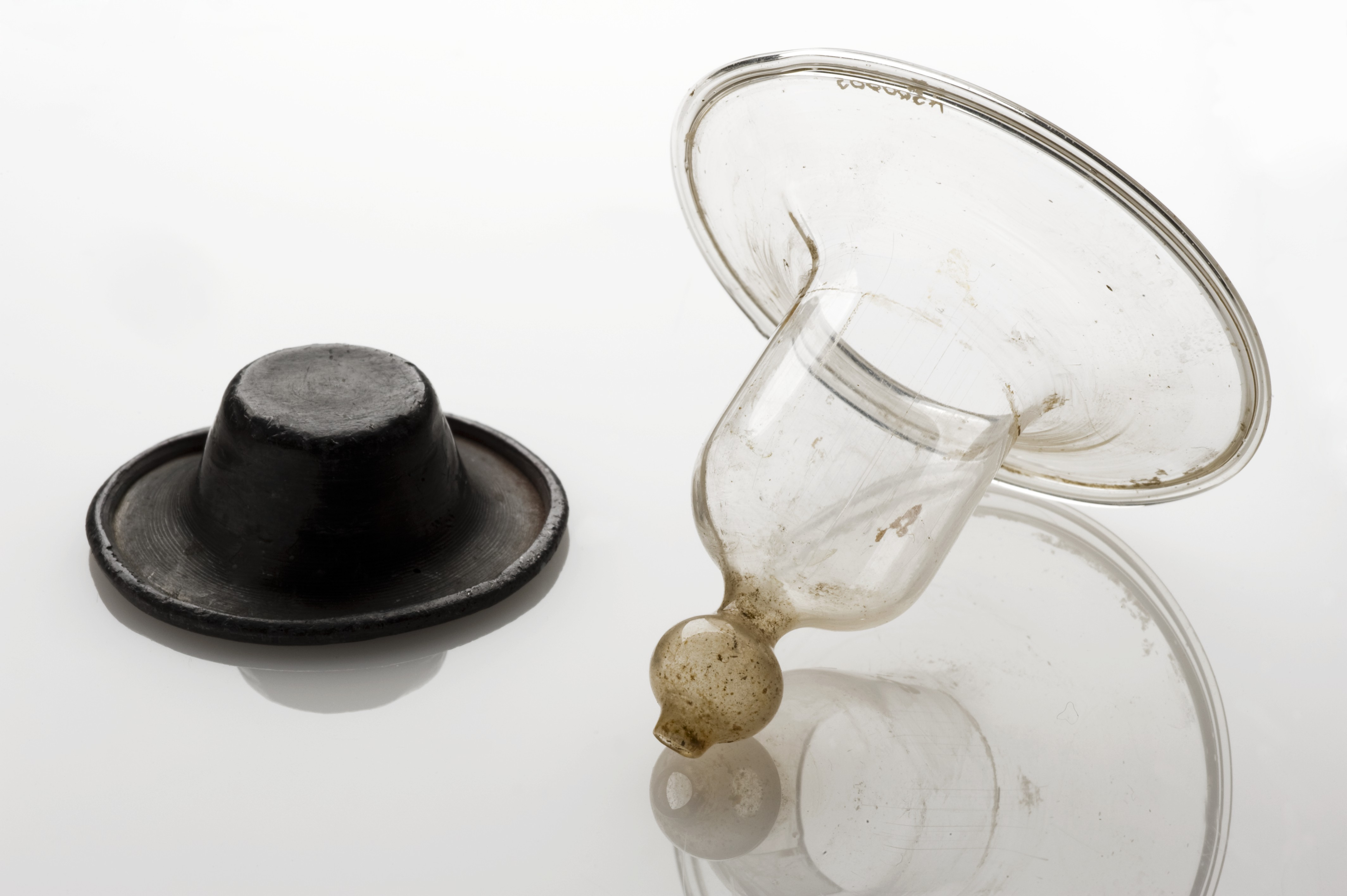
Lead nipple shield, left, and glass nipple shield, right. Lead nipple shields would cause lead poisoning.

Before the invention of plastics, nipple shields were made of animal skin, wax, metal, glass, wood or ivory. A 17th-century nipple shield held in Shakespeare's birthplace is made of pewter. Nipple shields were even made of lead, which can cause lead poisoning. Older nipple shields were made of latex and harder, thicker plastics, while more recent models are made of silicone.

== Usage ==
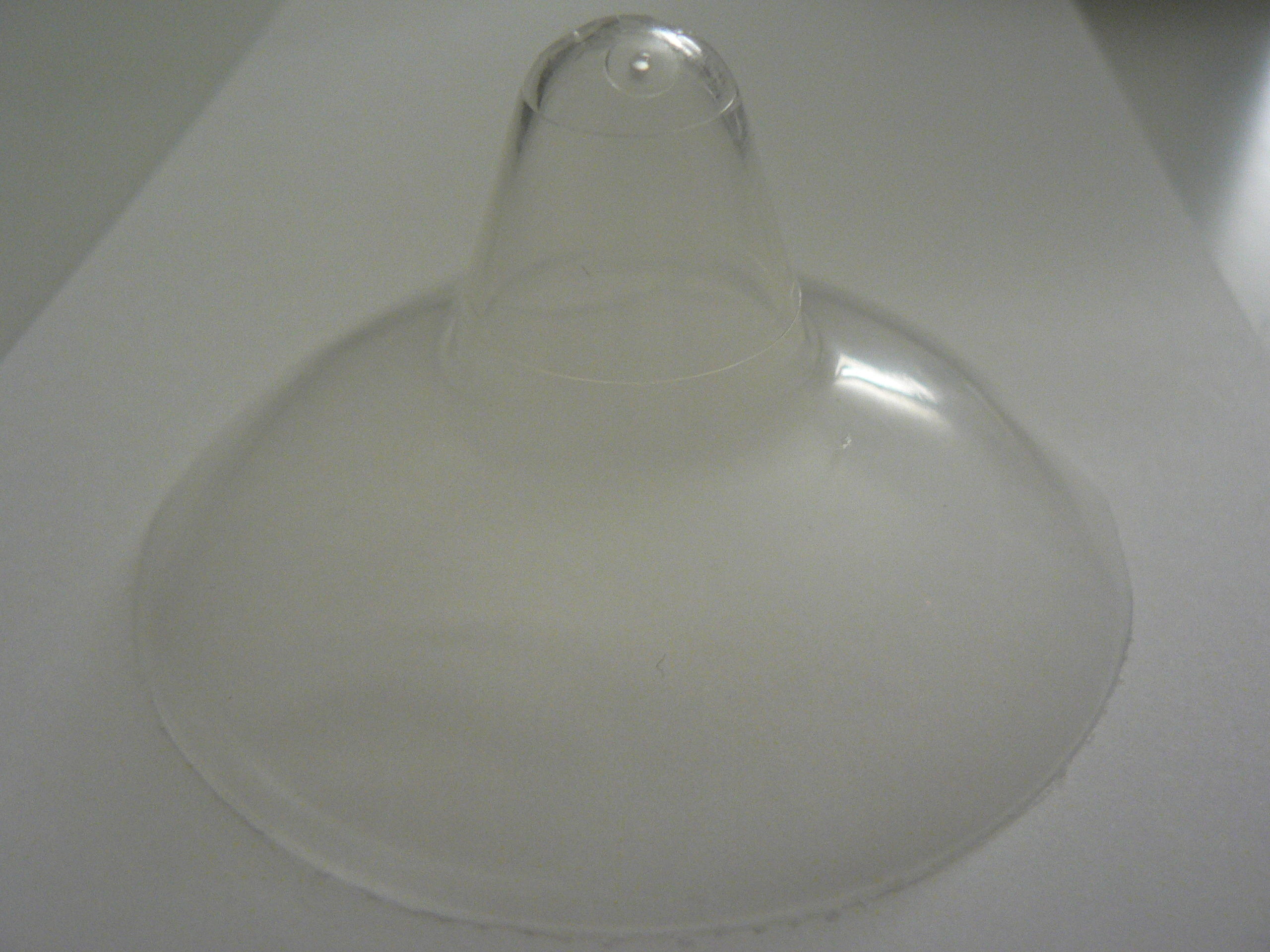
Silicone nipple shield

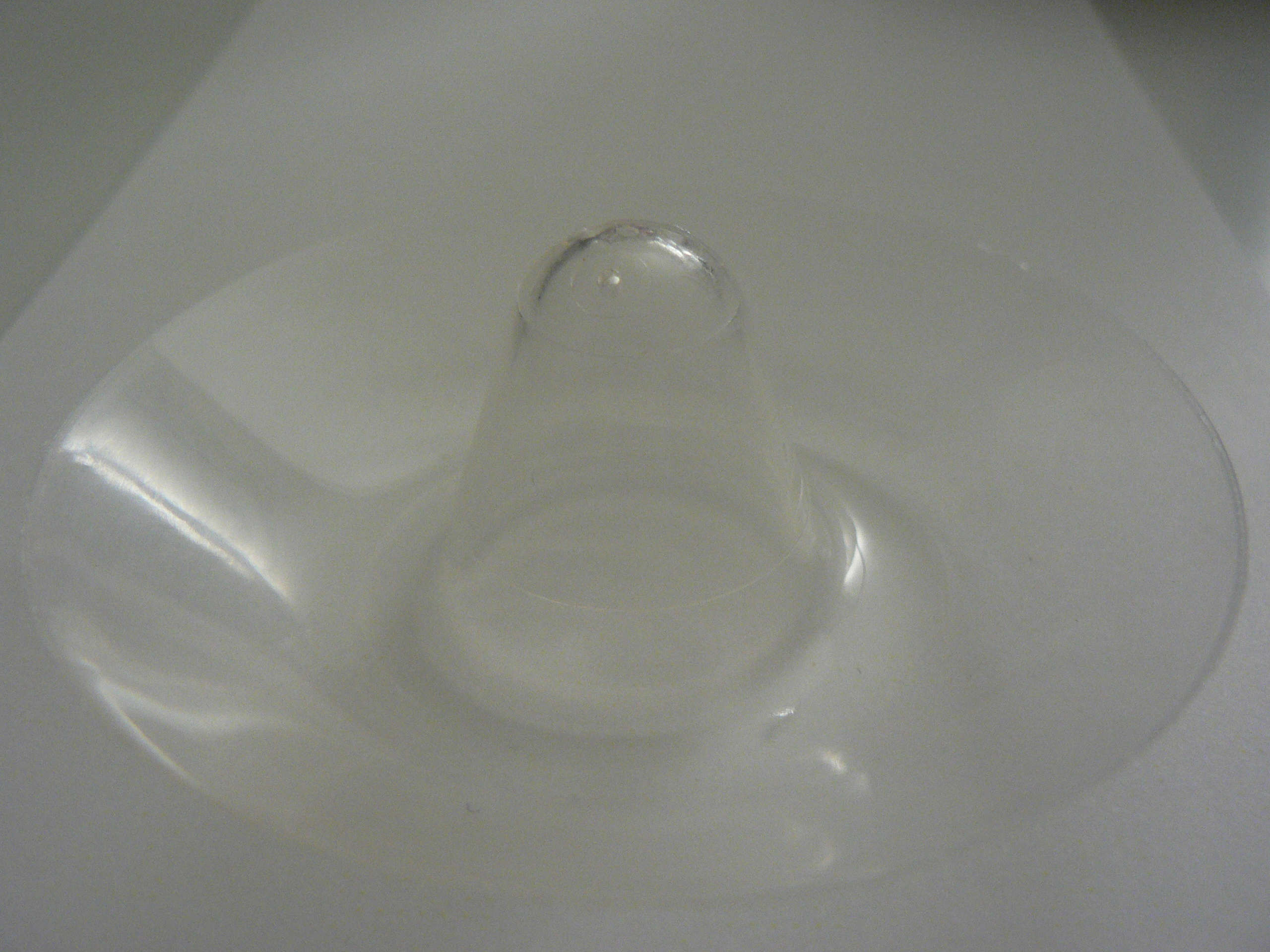
Shape inverted before application

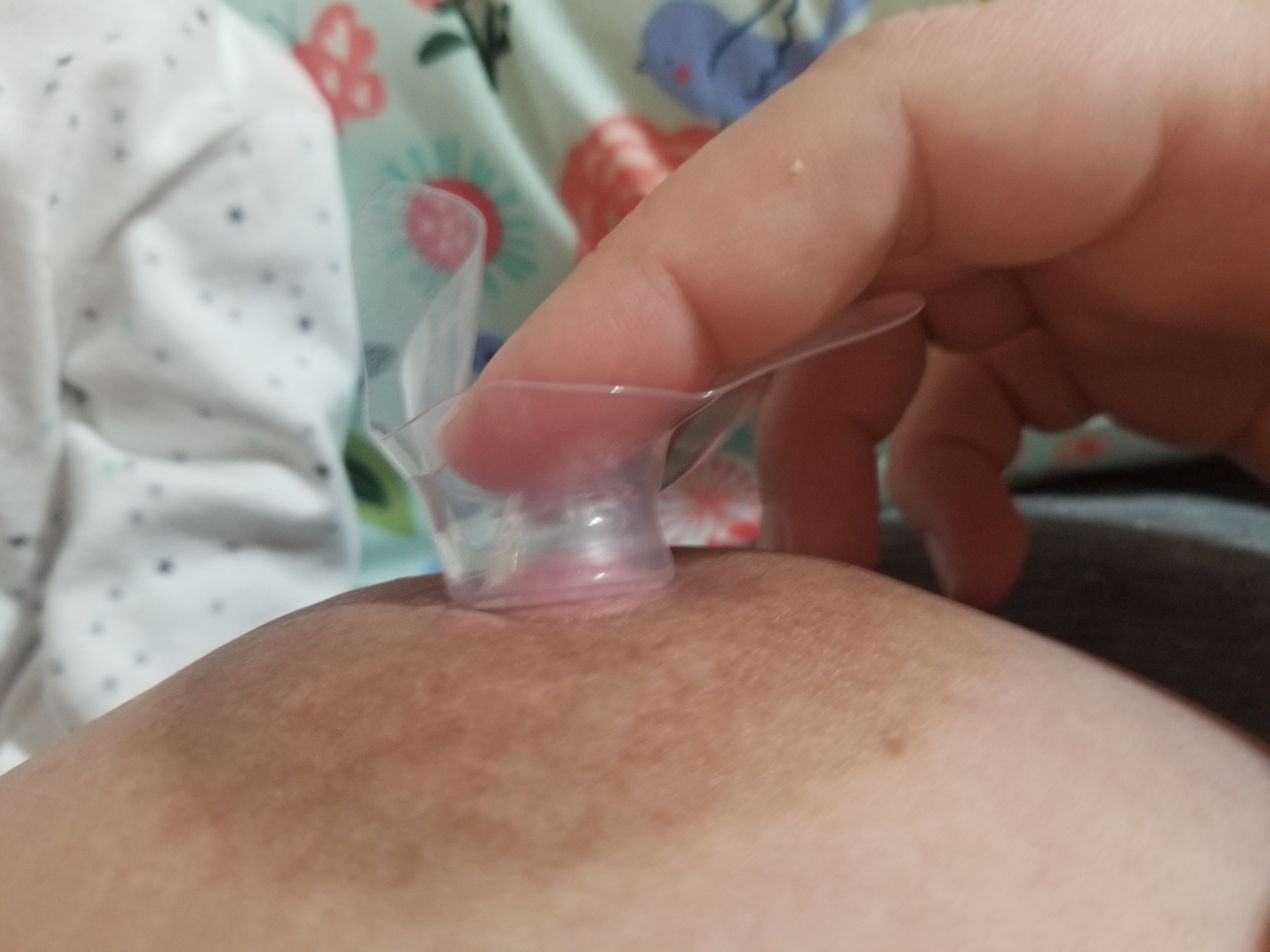
Placing shield

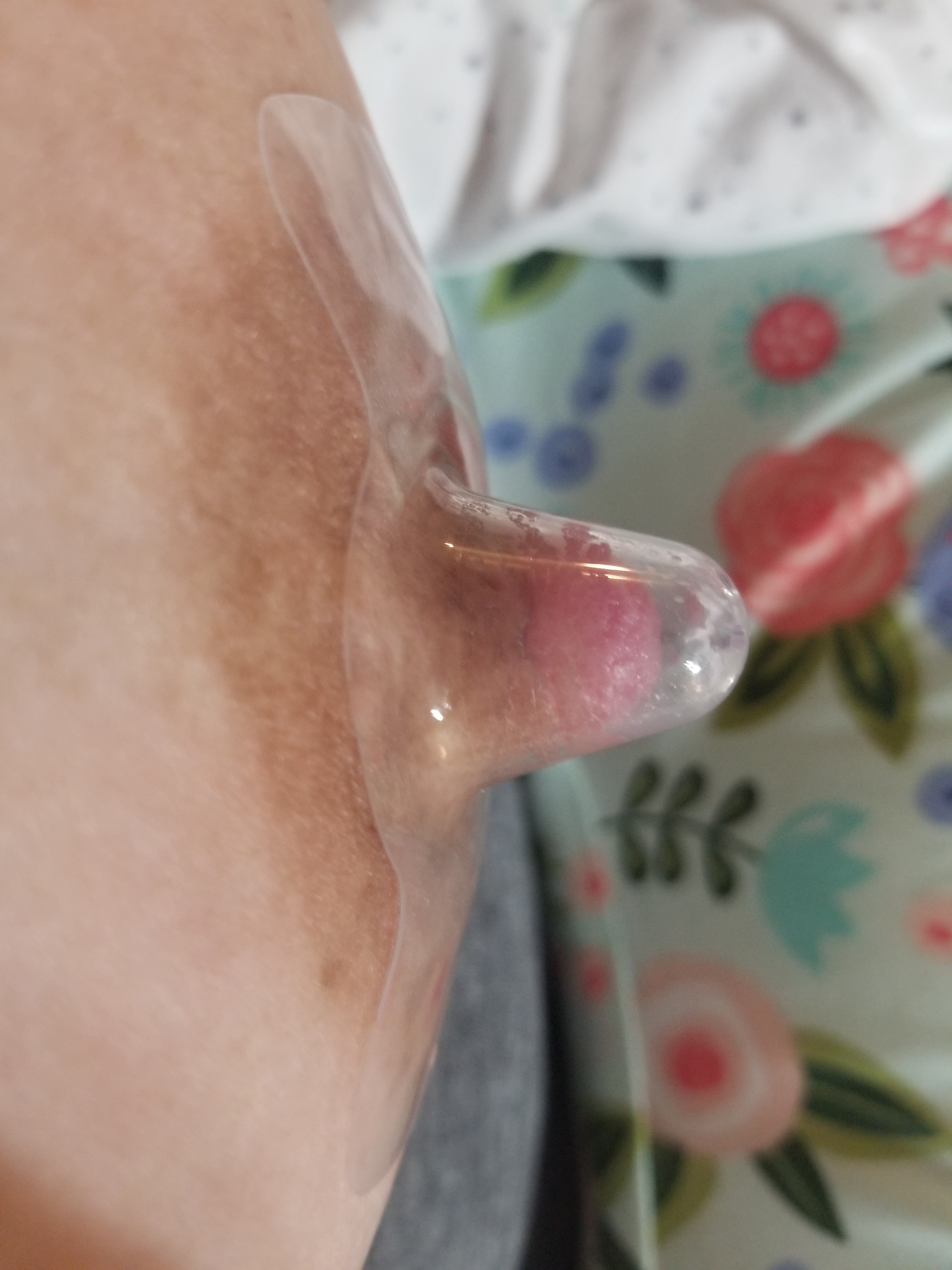
Shield applied

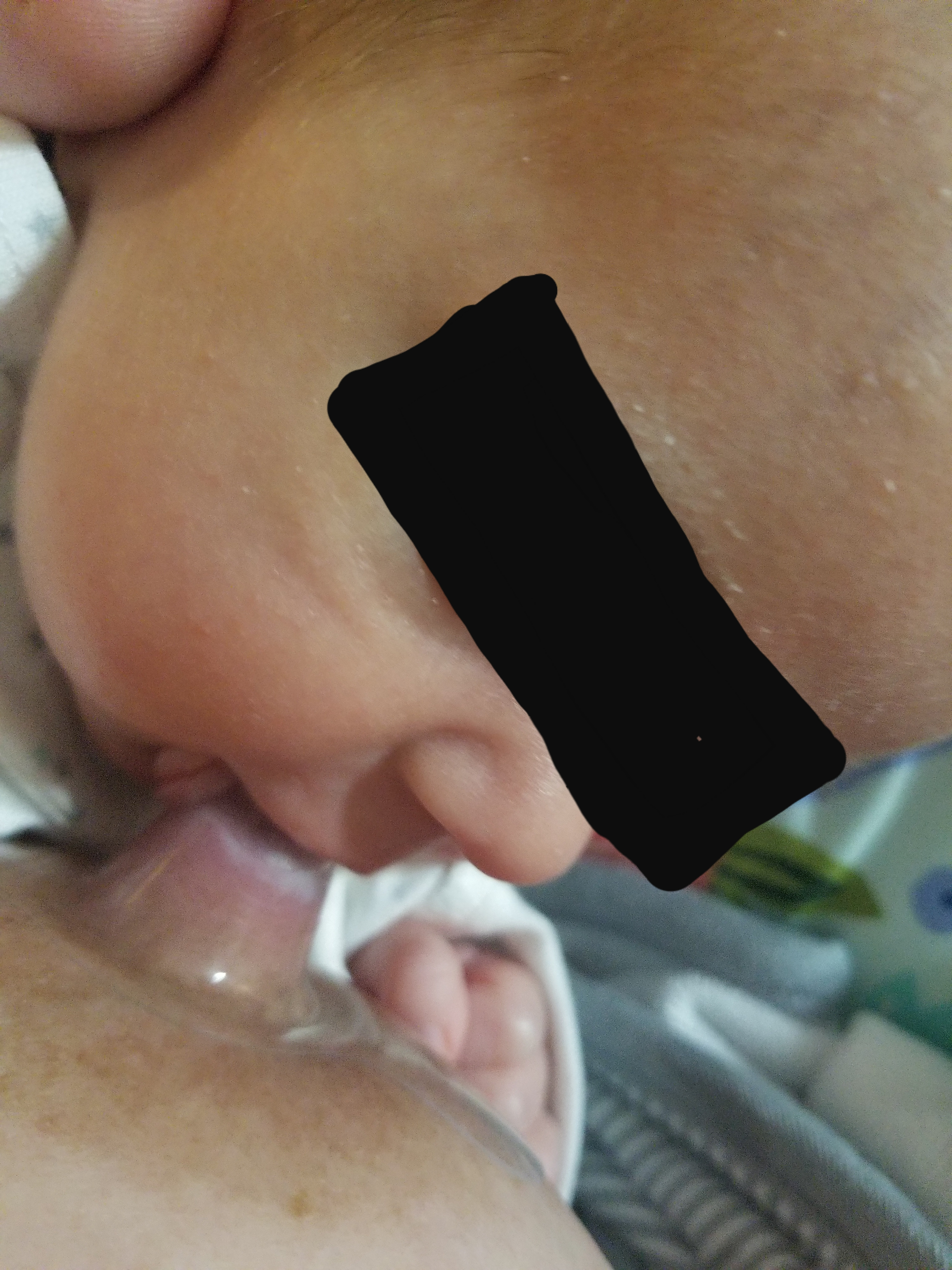
Infant starts to latch

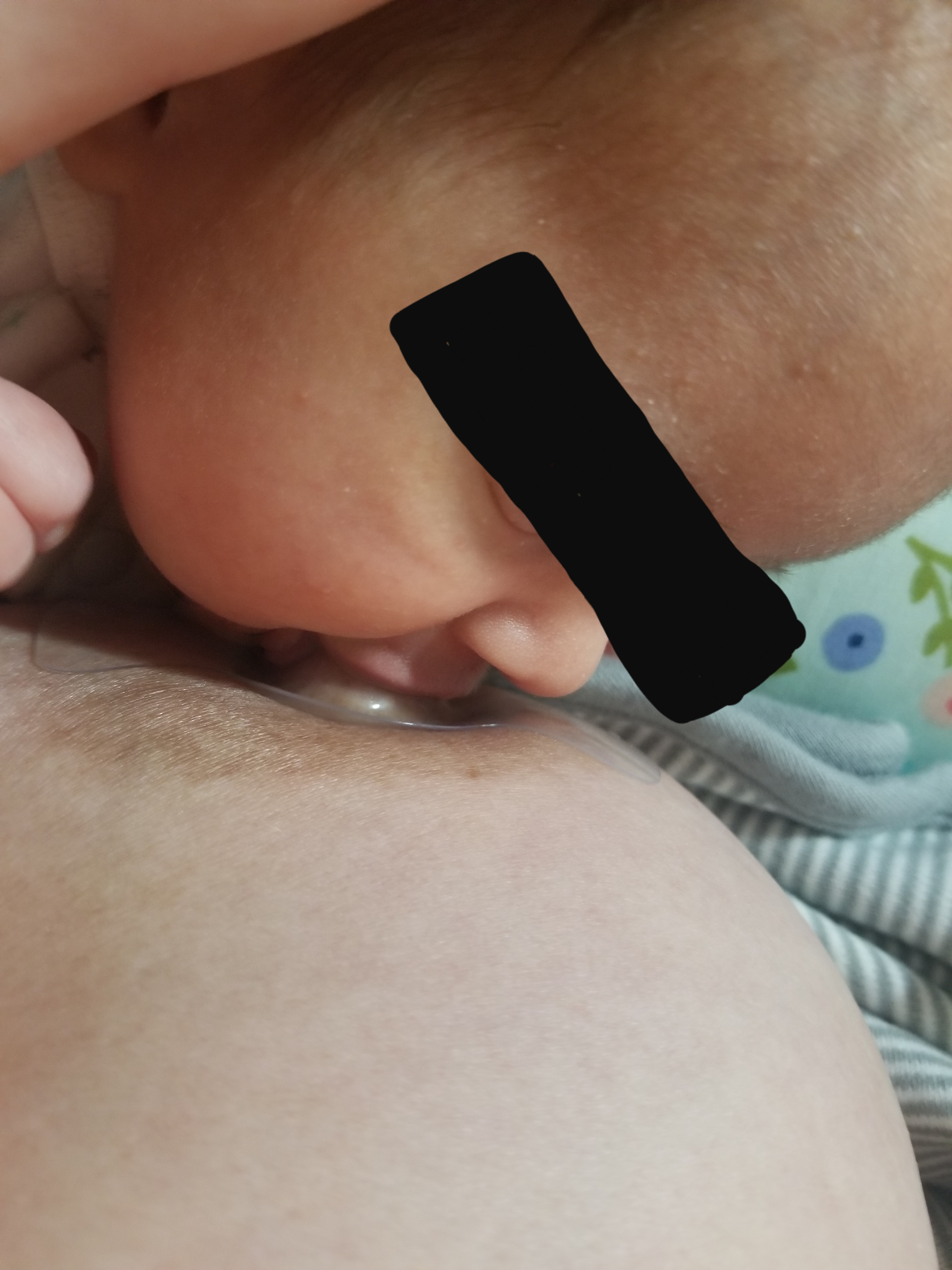
Infant fully latched on

Nipple shields are used in various situations:

- Some mothers have small or inverted nipples which make it difficult for the baby to latch on. Using a shield allows for feeding to progress until the baby's suction draws out the nipple.
- Small, weak or sick babies often have difficulty latching on to the breast. A nipple shield makes latching easier and prevents the baby becoming discouraged.
- Babies who had to be bottle-fed since birth can become used to the bottle teat. Nipple shields feel more like teats, and aid with the transition to breast feeding.
- A mother's nipples can become sore or cracked from breastfeeding. A shield allows the mother to continue breastfeeding until her cracked nipples heal and she improves her latching technique.
- They make it easier to measure the quantity of milk consumed.

Most doctors and lactation consultants stress that nipple shields use should be temporary; the aim is always to return to regular breastfeeding, unless otherwise indicated.

Breast shells may be confused with nipple shields, but shields are intended for use during the act of breastfeeding, whereas breast shells are worn in preparation for breastfeeding.

== See also ==
- Breast shell
- Pasties, a nipple cover used when the breast is otherwise exposed
