= Maxi Mounds =

American porn star

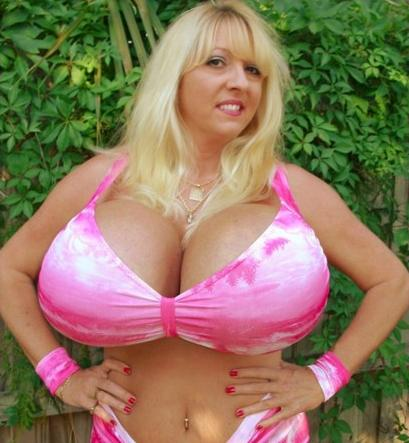
- Maxi posing in PhotoClubs pictorial
- Born: October 25, 1964 (age 62); Valley Stream, New York, U.S.
- Occupations: Nude big-bust model; stripper; occasional pornographic actress
- Modeling information
- Height: 6 ft 0 in (1.83 m), 75-25-36 in
- Hair color: Blonde
- Eye color: Hazel
- Website: maximounds.bustysupermodels.com

Maxi Mounds (born October 25, 1964) is an American nude big-bust model, stripper and occasional pornographic actress originally from the Long Island, New York area. Mounds is known for her extremely large breast implants. Mounds' implants are polypropylene string breast implants, which irritate the breast tissue, causing the breasts to grow continuously as they fill with fluid. According to her official website, Mounds' breasts each weigh twenty-eight pounds (thirteen kilograms). She is 6 feet 0 inches (1.83 meters) in height. Mounds has polypropylene string breast implants which are also used by fellow big-bust entertainers Chelsea Charms, and Minka, to achieve very large bust sizes.

== Career ==
In 1995, Mounds began appearing on the exotic dancing circuit with then fellow stripper Mini Mounds as a duo act called "Moving Violations"; the two were recognized by two awards competitions in 1999, in becoming the USA Duo Champion, and also by the World Duo Competition, where they were the 1st runner-up. The two continued to perform together as an act until Mini's retirement from the circuit in 2005.

=== Adult videos ===
Mounds also has appeared in several softcore girl/girl adult videos and pictorials with fellow adult entertainer and exotic dancer Kayla Kleevage.

=== World's Largest Enhanced Breasts record ===
Mounds holds the Guinness World Record for the "World's Largest Augmented Breasts". She approached Guinness in August 2003, but the category did not yet exist. After creating the category, Guinness contacted her to request documentation of her measurements. She was presented with an official certificate that reads:

Maxi Mounds (USA) was measured at Sarasota, Florida, USA, on 4 February 2005 and found to have an under breast measurement of 91.44 cm (36 in) and an around chest-over-nipple measurement of 153.67 cm (60.5 in). She currently wears a US size 42M bra (UK 42J).

=== TV appearances and her Guide to Exotic Dancing ===
Mounds published a book, The Maxi Mounds Guide To The World Of Exotic Dancing (ISBN 0-9734333-1-0), under Perpetual Summer Publishing. She has made numerous television appearances on talk shows such as Jerry Springer, The Jenny Jones Show, and Univision's Cristina as well as MANswers and numerous foreign/overseas TV programs in places such as Japan, Germany, Great Britain and South America.
