= Eleuterio Quiñones =

Fictional character on Puerto Rican radio and television

(Don) Eleuterio Quiñones, voiced by Sunshine Logroño, is a recurring fictional character in Puerto Rican radio and television. It is supposed to depict a die-hard supporter of statehood for Puerto Rico, whose passion for the subject and support of the New Progressive Party of Puerto Rico verges on the absurd. The character is loosely based on the archetypical Puerto Rican peasant, the jibaro, with a sizeable dose of Archie Bunker thrown in.

== Eleuterio, the character ==
Eleuterio Quiñones is reportedly a 75-year-old man, divorced from his Puerto Rican wife (who left him for an American drill sergeant), who lives in a blue house on the Camarones section of Guaynabo, Puerto Rico, along with his son Elpidio. Due to his passionate love for the United States he flies the Stars and Stripes in front of his house. Since he's the only one in the barrio with the American flag in his porch, his neighbors call the house "El Correo", "The Post Office" in Spanish. The house is blue, given Eleuterio's affiliation to the New Progressive Party of Puerto Rico, whose logo is blue.

Don Eleuterio was depicted in the early incarnations of the character as a grumpy old man, easily angered by life's minor irritations. Recent incarnations depict him as less irritated (and more tolerant) than before. However, Eleuterio is still prone to fits of anger, and throws things quite loudly whenever he loses an argument and proof is shown to him, or when something personal happens to him that goes against his political philosophy (such as his son Elpidio joining a PDP campaign rally for a joyride, for example).

Don Eleuterio despises the Puerto Rican culture, but is a direct product of it. His commentary on Puerto Rican culture is affected by his personal experiences as a native of Puerto Rico and as a World War II veteran (in the character's beginnings, more recently the Korean War is used as to keep up with time). However, he has never set a foot outside Puerto Rico. His experience with true American culture is limited to the time he was stationed at a local United States Army camp near his home during the war. As a consequence of this, he considers the proverbial destination of most recent Puerto Rican émigrés, Orlando, Florida, to be the statehooders' equivalent of Mecca, with the giant Mickey Mouse-eared water tank near the entrance of Walt Disney World as the Kaabah.

The character's name allegedly came from using the Bristol Almanac, a long-standing almanac popular to Latin America that is published by New York City soap maker Murray and Kemp, and is similar in concept to Poor Richard's Almanack, as a source of baby names. The Almanac lists the Catholic saints of each day, from which a name could be selected for a newborn depending on the day of his birth; in theory this puts Don Eleuterio's birthday as occurring on 20 February, the day of St. Eleutherius of Constantinople, and right after the consecutive (and purely coincidental) birthdays (17 February - 19 February) of three Puerto Rican governors: Luis A. Ferré, Luis Muñoz Marín and Roberto Sánchez Vilella (in that order). Eleuterio hates his name, since it is decidedly non-American. In reality, Logroño used "Eleuterio" as a name to reinforce the character's Puerto Ricanness, since the coquí, a frog native to Puerto Rico, has the scientific name of Eleutherodactylus coqui. Since the coquí has traditionally (and erroneously) been viewed as so local to Puerto Rico as to die if taken out of his habitat (proven wrong by its recent acclimatization to Hawaii), the name "Eleuterio" evokes a similar connotation.

Don Eleuterio is in record as being homophobic, a misogynist, a hater of reggaetón, and intolerant of Puerto Rican cuisine, and particularly "gandinga" (tripe) as the worst offender. He is also a racist, although a bit ashamed of being so since he is racially mixed himself. He uses the term people of color (which may be politically correct to some English language speakers but a derogatory euphemism in Spanish) to refer to blacks. He essentially considers most poor and young Puerto Ricans as being potential drug addicts. Yet, he claims constantly to be "completamente neutrarrrr" (sic), a phrase mispronounced on purpose to depict Eleuterio as lacking culture.

However, none of these prejudices are openly vented by Don Eleuterio until the "right" opportunity comes about -most often when a news item is commented and Eleuterio takes off in a tangent that makes no sense when related to it. For example, his racism usually flows to the surface when commenting about the stereotypical incompatibility in sizes between the genitalia of multiracial couples. He commonly insults callers to his radio program as being "huelepega" (glue sniffers), and wonders when the offender is going to inject his dose of marijuana (sic) next. According to Eleuterio, the character's creator (Logroño, who Eleuterio claims to have no relation with) is a "tecato", a heroin addict.

Eleuterio speaks very little English. He claims he will not say an English word in public, as to not humiliate any Puerto Ricans talking to him, but in reality he only uses two English phrases in daily conversation: "Yes" (with which he answers almost any question asked to him in English) and "An Sori" ("I Am Sorry"), the first phrase he says whenever he encounters any American. He begs for forgiveness to Americans for the poor use Puerto Ricans have made of everything the country "has bestowed" on Puerto Rico, from the English language to welfare, and on to hamburgers, hot dogs and apple pie.

Eleuterio's trademark phrase, when praising anything American or pro-American, is the refrain of an old Pentecostal hymn in Spanish, "¡Alábalo, que Vive!" ("Praise -Him-, for -He- lives!"). A converse phrase he mentions when he is angry is "¡Maldita sean los cue'nos (d)er Diablo!" ("Damn be the horns of the Devil!")

=== Known, but not seen ===
In theory, no one from the general public has ever seen Don Eleuterio. Whenever a television comedy sketch was featured where Eleuterio would be a part of, he would speak hidden inside his house, from behind a window. Reportedly this occurs because Eleuterio is ashamed of his kinky hair and dark skin. He blames the local tap water for his hair's coarseness; as for his skin color, he considers himself white, along with 84% of the Puerto Rican population.

In practice, Logroño dressed once as Eleuterio Quiñones (namely, as a Puerto Rican peasant) for a televised episode of Los Rayos Gamma where Silverio Pérez's birthday was being held. This is the only known public appearance by Eleuterio ever recorded. In other public appearances, Logroño hides from view and uses a microphone to do the character as a voice-over.

=== Political views ===
In the character's beginning, Eleuterio was, first and foremost, an admirer of NPP leader Carlos Romero Barceló, particularly Romero's stubborn strength as a populist contender against the Popular Democratic Party of Puerto Rico. His initial idea of Puerto Rican statehood resembled that of "jíbaro statehood", the dual concept of Puerto Rican cultural preservation under statehood that Romero promoted in his book "Statehood is For The Poor". Therefore, Eleuterio would speak fondly of Puerto Rican food and music (namely, that of Rafael Hernández Marín) as a complement to American cultural icons such as Tommy Dorsey. Of course, this image would be taken to the extreme: Don Eleuterio claims that Burger King outlets would be physically deflated as a balloon and rolled, as to be taken out of the country as if they were a roll of linoleum, should independence ever be granted to Puerto Rico.

As a Romero supporter, Eleuterio viewed the emergence of Pedro Rosselló as NPP leader with great skepticism. As Rosselló consolidated his leadership within the NPP, however, Eleuterio grew acceptant of the less Puerto Rican-centric view of the country Rosselló's supporters had within the NPP.

As time passed, Eleuterio started inviting political leaders to his radio program. Politicians from outside the NPP took these invitations in stride, but NPP leaders were hesitant at first, since they feared guilt by association. However, as many NPP leaders broke the ice, eventually Romero visited his program and took advantage of the character's popularity. So have most NPP leaders, with the notable exception of Rosselló.

Eleuterio is very publicly pro-American, but some topics are off-limits in his radio and television appearances, namely 9/11 and specific details about the Iraq War.

=== Eleuterio's son, Elpidio ===
Elpidio Quiñones (sometimes referred to by the diminutive, Elpidito) is the son of Eleuterio, and is also played by Logroño. Contrary to Eleuterio, Elpidio has a very public profile. He is a special education patient, reportedly 39 years old but with the mental age of an eighth grader, with the sophomoric sense of humor to match. He constantly wears a Superman t-shirt, and has a large overbite (Logroño plays the character wearing a dental prosthesis).

Elpidio is, therefore, naïve enough not to understand the ulterior motives of his classmates. Two of his neighbors are particularly guilty of charging admission to other classmates to show Elpidio naked from the waist down and exhibiting his rather overdeveloped genitalia at school. Elpidio, being an adult, is not carded for purchasing liquor, and is tricked into buying beer and pornography by his mates.

Elpidio appears sometimes, either in radio or in television, alongside his mutt, Matruco, a rather affable dog who likes his belly to be scratched (something that inevitably raises Elpidio's curiosity about the dog's penis).

At times, Don Eleuterio has been accused of mistreating his son, particularly because he never changes the family diet; since the only decent cooking recipe Eleuterio knows was the one he learned as attendant of a mess hall while in the Army (and since cooking anything more extravagant would be, in his view, effeminate), he feeds his son steamed white rice, mashed potatoes and canned corn every single day (and sometimes for both lunch and dinner).

Elpidio is (or was) a regular character in various television series produced by Logroño: "De Noche Con Sunshine", "El Condominio" and "Por el casco de San Juan". On these programs, recurring character "Doña Soto" (played by Suzette Bacó) claims, after seeing Elpidio naked accidentally a few times, that "Él no es ningún nene ná" ("He's no little kid, awright!")

=== Eleuterio's love life ===
Don Eleuterio's first wife Virginia, left him for an African American drill sergeant, which is one of his justifications for being racist. This occurred when Elpidio was a little boy; custody was granted to Eleuterio since she fled the Puerto Rican jurisdiction. He then spent years without female company.

Eventually, Don Eleuterio befriended a widow, a Cuban pharmacist, named Iris Eduarda, who is also a die-hard pro-statehood supporter (as many exiled Cubans in Puerto Rico are). Although Eleuterio denies it, they seem to have shared intimate moments; more than a few times she has mentioned the fact that Eleuterio uses "la pildorita azul" ("the little blue pill"), in reference to Viagra.

In recent programs Iris Eduarda has antagonized with listeners, since she is currently demanding that Eleuterio leave his radio program, marry her and move to a post-Fidel Castro Cuba. Her interventions have angered listeners, who constantly advise Eleuterio against marrying her. Eleuterio is yet to decide whether he'll marry her or not.

When Miriam Ramirez de Ferrer became a widow, a chance visit to Don Eleuterio's program raised audiences expectations about a possible "romance" between the two. Ramirez and Logroño played the "romance" for close to three weeks through aired phone conversations. In an NPP fundraising party Ramirez and some followers staged a mock marriage between a costumed actor and Ramirez. Suspecting the situation had gone out of hand, Don Eleuterio claimed that he was "framed" and that everything was a setup.

== History ==
The character of Eleuterio Quiñones dates from the mid-1980s, when it was part of the lineup for "Rompiendo el día" a morning radio show Logroño used to host with fellow actor and member of the Puerto Rican political satire collective Los Rayos Gamma, Silverio Pérez. The radio station's studios were in Guaynabo, and whenever Logroño entered the building he would see the landscape attendant, an old man, struggling to pull weeds out. Logroño would discuss with Pérez how he would imagine the attendant's voice, what would his political persuasion be, and so on. Based on him, Logroño developed the character for his morning show. The show did not survive, but the character was well received by the show's audience.

When Logroño started doing his highly controversial television show, "Sunshine's Café" on WAPA-TV, small sketches featuring actor Jaime Bello interviewing Eleuterio from outside his house were regularly featured in the show. Similar "appearances" occurred in televised showings of Los Rayos Gamma.

With time, Logroño was given the chance to do a political satire show on television station WAPA-TV, which was called "Politiqueando", in 1996. As means to promote the television program, Logroño staged short on-air telephone calls to Salsoul, a Puerto Rican radio station. The early evening disc-jockey, Fernando Arévalo, would talk to some of the characters of the show, namely a cat puppet of Logroño's called Polito Garrapatoso, as well as to Don Eleuterio, for no longer than five minutes. Success from these phone calls was such that audiences demanded a longer treatment. Agitando El Show was then born, giving Eleuterio ten, and later twenty minutes of airtime. Eventually the program grew in length, and Don Eleuterio was given a full hour of airtime daily. The program's name, "Agitando", means "Shaking (people up)", as to depict the expected uproar from segments of the audience whenever Don Eleuterio went on the air.

=== Controversy ===
Since Logroño is a pro-independence supporter, most statehooders see Eleuterio as an offensive character, and point to Logroño as having a covert agenda against the movement. Logroño counters by stating that he doesn't have to write a script for his character since, as his occasional mentor José Miguel Agrelot said constantly, "the world is the best scriptwriter", and merely observing older statehood supporters in Puerto Rico provides him of enough original material. Logroño also claims that some of Eleuterio's criticism against some traditional customs within Puerto Rican culture, such as impunctuality, actually has a positive effect. However, he does concede that the whole concept of Don Eleuterio is that of irony taken to the extreme.

Critics such as former PNP (and now independent) senator Orlando Parga, Jr. have debased the character publicly. However, because of the character's durability, most statehooders are by now used to Don Eleuterio's outrageousness, as evidenced by Parga's visit to his radio program in early 2006.

=== Missing in action ===
Eleuterio has a tendency to disappear from the airwaves of his radio program whenever an event negative to the PNP or the pro-statehood cause happens. For example, after the PDPs victory over the PNP in the 2000 general elections, Eleuterio spent three days off the air, while convalescing from an extreme case of diarrhea, induced by his ingestion of whiskey. Calls to the Quiñones household were answered by Elpidio, who would try to have his father reach the telephone, to no avail.

== Cultural relevance ==
=== "You're Don Eleuterio!" ===
Don Eleuterio's views on life and politics in Puerto Rico are so extreme, that the character now serves as a cultural reference. Whenever someone's views within a group of people in Puerto Rico depict them as an extremist within the country's pro-statehood movement, or leaning too much to the conservative side of the political spectrum, the subject may find themself described as a "Don Eleuterio" by their peers.

=== Eleuterio, the historian ===
Around the time the 100th anniversary of the invasion of Puerto Rico by American forces during the Spanish–American War was about to be celebrated (or protested, depending on someone's political view) in 1998, NPP Secretary of State (and later senator) Norma Burgos suggested in a newspaper article, that Puerto Ricans such as Julio J. Henna had petitioned United States president William McKinley for an invasion, as to relieve Puerto Ricans of Spanish rule. In her article, she wanted to open the debate on whether Henna and other petitioners actually wanted McKinley to annex Puerto Rico to the United States and that, by using that as an excuse, McKinley had consented. In other words, Burgos established the theory of Puerto Rico being "invaded by invitation" by American troops.

According to historical record, the United States had been considering establishing a military base in the Caribbean as early as 1867. There is some evidence that Puerto Rico (or parts of it) had been considered as a candidate for such a base (through either invasion or purchase) as early as 1891. Historians claim that, even considering Henna's petition as an actual request for invasion, the timing of the letter was merely coincidental to a military event that was probably going to happen anyway, and as such, was arguably not affected by Henna's early request. In fact, a later meeting involving Henna, McKinley, Eugenio María de Hostos, Manuel Zeno Gandía and other Puerto Rican leaders did take place in the White House in Washington, D.C. (on January 19, 1899), in which they asked for a level of self-government similar or better to the one that had been granted to Puerto Rico just months before the invasion (to which McKinley reportedly refused later).

Burgos' article came about in a period when there was considerable debate in Puerto Rico on whether the public school system was being used by then pro-statehood governor Pedro Rosselló as a political indoctrination tool or not. When historians disputed Burgos' claim (which was favorably viewed by Eleuterio) as a distortion of historical fact, Burgos was publicly ridiculed by some. Eleuterio went to the point of "editing" a newspaper article (first published in Puerto Rico's premiere daily, El Nuevo Día) in which he claimed that Puerto Rican history before 1898 and the Spanish–American War was almost non-existent, and that the Taíno natives of Puerto Rico were its first drug traffickers. He meant the article to be used as a reference in Puerto Rican schools.

Burgos later lamented the incident, claiming that she was primarily a public administrator, and as such, she had better left the subject of historical debate to historians.

=== Guaynabo City ===
The PNP mayor of Guaynabo, Héctor O'Neill, bought a few English-language stop signs in 1998, as to save some money (English signs were cheaper than Spanish ones because of economies of scale in the United States). At the suggestion of Rios Gracia 137, one of Guaynabo's Municipal Policemen who was in-charge of the Uniform Crime Reporting Office. Rios took a step further by creating the concept of Guaynabo City in all federal agencies in the United States (who had designed an English-language sign for his police unit), O'Neill had Ríos' sign design painted and placed in front of the police unit's office. He took the concept further and had a graphic artist redesign a new corporate identity for the city's police department. As he feared it would happen once he approved the proposed designs (O'Neill's candid reaction once he saw the proposed design for the police's patrol cars was reported in San Juan's El Vocero newspaper: "This looks gorgeous! Yet, I fear this will be all fucked up once people get to know about this!"), he was soon reprimanded by pro-independence citizens of town and Spanish language purists in Puerto Rico for his use of English but was publicly praised by Don Eleuterio, who is also a native. O'Neill then bought several police patrol cars with the English phrase "Guaynabo City Police" painted on them. As expected, Eleuterio gave his imprimatur to the move.

Many Puerto Ricans considered O'Neill's decision as a joke, as irritant as Eleuterio's humor. However, the publicity gave general acceptability to the use of the phrase "Guaynabo City" to describe the municipality, fueled in part by Don Eleuterio's approving rants. Since Guaynabo is also the city with the largest per capita income in Puerto Rico, it can afford to feature public works that are unique to the country, something that Eleuterio describes as "the closest thing in Puerto Rico to Walt Disney World", sort of a pro-statehood Valhalla.

The term was given international exposure in the Calle 13 song Atrévete-te-te, which used it in jest.

=== Ferdinand Pérez's rise to power ===
Don Eleuterio's radio program, "Agitando - El Show", was the first (and, for a while, the only) publicity resource PPD legislative candidate Ferdinand Pérez had to promote himself prior to his 2000 election as member of the Puerto Rico House of Representatives. He participated, along with two other youth leaders (one from each opposition party in Puerto Rico) in a weekly discussion panel hosted by Eleuterio. The program's demographics (mainly young adults) proved to be quite appropriate for Pérez, since he was elected as an at-large House member by the third largest margin in the 2000 elections, and as a result, was elected House vice-president -an unprecedented feat for a newcomer to Puerto Rican politics. Pérez has credited "Agitando" (and particularly Don Eleuterio) as directly responsible for his acquired popularity.

== Eleuterio's radio program ==
=== Format ===
Don Eleuterio is featured every weekday in Agitando El Show, which airs at 5:00 PM, AST. The program is hosted by Arévalo and Logroño (and recently, by Aimée Cora, the station's marketing executive, who happens to be the sister of MLB baseball players Joey Cora and Alex Cora). One of the station's sales executives, whose last name is Belgodere, joins the casts occasionally; his purpose is to balance Don Eleuterio's comments, given Belgodere's affiliation to the opposition party, the Popular Democratic Party of Puerto Rico.

Normally, the program starts by having Cora and Arévalo read the headlines of current news items. Don Eleuterio then joins in through the telephone (Logroño claims that the limited bandwidth of the phone call is actually preferred by the audience, rather than impersonating the character in the studio from behind a microphone). In the past, he usually started his intervention with a speech, complete with cathedral-like echo and a background rendition of "The Star-Spangled Banner" or "America The Beautiful". This only happens occasionally in recent airings of the program.

Eleuterio then comments the news items, along with Arévalo (and sometimes Belgodere or Cora). The commentary is usually punctuated by soundbites from previous visits by politicians to the program. These soundbites are guaranteed to be humorous or unflattering, as to elicit a comic effect. Two memorable ones are one by former governoress of Puerto Rico, Sila Calderón: "Mentira... ¡Mentira! Eso es una mentira, grande, así, como de éste tamaño..." ("Lie... A lie! That's a big lie, about this big!"), and another from current Senate of Puerto Rico president Kenneth McClintock: "¿Y qué carajo te importa?" ("And why the fuck should you care?").

Depending on the general mood of the program, he might open the phone lines for comments. Pro-statehood supporters usually ask him for his blessing, and some go to the extreme of calling him "Grandpa", in English. Non-statehood supporters are guaranteed to be scorned or ridiculed by Eleuterio.

=== Special Sections ===
If a news item proves to be controversial, Eleuterio breaks into an impromptu "Encuesta Relámpago" ("Flash Poll"), where people vote on two sides of an issue. Eleuterio only intervenes at the end of the poll.

In the beginning, Eleuterio used to host "La Tribuna" ("The Podium"), a discussion panel that involves three youth leaders, one from each major political party in Puerto Rico. They are, of course, exposed to Eleuterio's questioning and ranting. This segment was canceled later on.

Occasionally, Don Eleuterio receives emails and letters from people who praise a particular situation that they have experienced while visiting or living in the United States. An example of this may be: a Puerto Rican that recently moved to Seattle, Washington, bought a new refrigerator, is told by the salesperson at the store that the appliance would be delivered at precisely 10:00 AM (and not within an imprecise time or date range, as Eleuterio claims the norm is in Puerto Rico), and is delivered exactly at 9:59 AM. Eleuterio stages comments to these letters within a section called "El Otro Mundo" ("The Other World"), implying that the positive characteristic praised in it belongs somewhere too far removed from Puerto Rico from ever happening in the country. Usually, the music theme for The X-Files is played in the background while the section runs.

Don Eleuterio's intervention usually takes over the first hour of the show. The remaining half hour is usually reserved for Logroño's other comedic characters, Vitín Alicea (a clever closet homosexual who is a fan of wrestling), Chemba Osorio (a feminist who, at age 40, is unmarried by choice), or El Barbarazo del Amor (a sexual pervert turned into a media sexologist).

== See also ==
- Sunshine Logroño
