= Sunshine Logroño =

American actor

- Born: Emmanuel Logroño; November 1, 1951 (age 74); Bronx, New York, U.S.
- Occupation: Actor

Emmanuel Logroño (born November 1, 1951), better known as Sunshine Logroño, is a Puerto Rican actor. Logroño has worked in Puerto Rican media for close to five decades.

== Early years ==
Born in New York to a Puerto Rican mother, Logroño moved to San Juan, Puerto Rico along with his family when he was nine years old. He was soon recognized as a multifaceted entertainer by his schoolteachers and classmates. His nickname "Sunshine" came from a short stint (1973) as a disc jockey for San Juan-based WBMJ-AM, Puerto Rico's first rock and roll station (another WBMJ disc jockey at the time, Raymond Broussard, better known as Moonshadow, later became the co-host of El Vacilón de la Mañana, a very popular Spanish language morning radio talk show in New York City). Sunshine was also heard in 1974 as a part of the new announcing crew at "The New WRAI" 1520, a station created by Bill Thompson and "Radio Man" after the format change from English to Spanish at WBMJ. Besides his short stint as a disc jockey, Logroño served as a voice actor for Puerto Rico's then-active dubbing industry. His was the Spanish-language voice for "Little Joe", one of the Cartwright brothers (played by Michael Landon) in the U.S. television show Bonanza.

Logroño obtained a Bachelor of Arts (English Language Literature) degree ("a degree in unemployment", Logroño claims) from the University of Puerto Rico at Río Piedras and a Master of Arts (Theater) degree from Michigan State University. After his return to Puerto Rico, Logroño was a member of the Puerto Rican folk group, Moliendo Vidrio, which also starred bandleader Gary Nuñez and later comedic actress Carmen Nydia Velázquez. Moliendo Vidrio made a few albums during the 1970s. By the late years of that decade, the group disbanded.

Logroño kept himself busy in the late 1970s as a voice talent for radio commercials, as a comedic actor on Puerto Rican television, and as a radio host. He co-hosted a morning radio program, Rompiendo el Día (Daybreak) with Puerto Rican entrepreneur and musician Silverio Pérez, and served as part of the comedic team behind Desafiando a los Genios (Defying the Geniuses), a popular TV mock quiz show starring, among others, actor, writer and film director Jacobo Morales and Puerto Rico's premier comedic actor, José Miguel Agrelot. Two of Logroño's TV characters would surface around this time: Agapito Flores, a rather naive country bumpkin with a speech impairment, and Nicky El Bro, a Nuyorican hustler. A third character, "Chinito Rivera" (a flasher that said little and wore a raincoat he was eager to open at the slightest provocation) would eventually evolve into "El Barbarazo del Amor", one of his radio characters. He was along several figures, including Los Gamma, that participated in the inauguration of Súper Siete following the purchase of the channel. With a loose concept Los siete del Siete would take over the prime time slot Thursdays, and be host by a number of local talents including Agrelot, Morales, Olivo, Avellanet, Jovet and Logroño.

== Los Rayos Gamma ==
Morales and Perez would soon revive, along with actor and radio announcer Horacio Olivo, a musical group named Los Rayos Gamma, Puerto Rico's most beloved political satire troupe, which had an extremely short but popular stint in 1968 as the creative vehicle for the late satirical writer and journalist, Eddie López. Logroño filled in for Pérez on vacation, and when Pérez returned, he was allowed to fill in López's shoes (who was considered irreplaceable by some), with great success. Los Rayos Gamma had a television show on channel 7 where they satirized politicians with their songs to high ratings and which would be taken off the air due to their rather direct satirical jabs at then-governor of Puerto Rico Carlos Romero Barceló. They went on to make a few albums and would return to the public spotlight in roughly four-year intervals, coinciding with each general election in Puerto Rico.

At his initial stages in "Los Rayos Gamma", Logroño created a character that seemed to lighten up the absurdity and gravity of another character, played by Morales, that was in turn based on a real-life incident. During the 1930s, Dr. Cornelius P. Rhoads, in charge of health services for the Institute of Tropical Medicine in San Juan, wrote a few letters to friends in the United States in which he described his hatred for Puerto Ricans. Whether the letters were in jest or not, he claimed in them to have implanted cancer cells in local subjects without their consent. One of these letters was intercepted by affiliates to Pedro Albizu Campos's Nationalist Party of Puerto Rico, and Albizu vehemently denounced Rhoades as an unethical and sadistic doctor who treated his patients as guinea pigs. At their television show, Morales played a descendant of Rhoads, "Dr. Cornelius Rodas"; Logroño played his assistant, Igor, wearing a fake hunch, doing guttural noises, and inevitably messing up whatever plans Rodas had for his avowed plans to exterminate Puerto Ricans. Igor reportedly was created when Rodas submitted an unwilling participant to a 23-hour long orgasm using Frankenstein-like electrodes. Igor was a big fan of Puerto Rican culture, Van Halen and pornography, and walked around with a small doll, "Calerito", resembling him, a comedic device that preceded Mini Me by many years. Due to the physical demands on him while playing the character, Logroño has since played Igor only sporadically. A big fan of the character, who got "Igor" as a nickname when he imitated him in high school for his friends, is Juan Gonzalez, the Major League Baseball player.

Los Rayos Gamma edited a music album in 1982, from which "Me apesta la vida" (My Life Stinks), a funk-meets-rap fusion song penned by Logroño, was a minor radio hit in Puerto Rico. Logroño updated the song in a newer version, found in the 2006 Culebro Mendoza album "Culebro Legal", this time set to a hip-hop beat.

== Later years ==
After Los Rayos Gamma's TV show was yanked off the air, Sunshine kept active, doing voice-overs for commercials (at one time half of all radio commercials in Puerto Rico featured Logroño's talents in one way or another) and making appearances at several TV shows and radio programs. At one of these shows the comedic characters of Eleuterio Quiñones and his son Elpidio were born. Eleuterio Quiñones, a die-hard supporter of Puerto Rican statehood whose grasp of public affairs and general culture level would be best compared to those of Archie Bunker in the U.S., and his son Elpidio -a 38-year-old special education patient with the emotional age of a child but with rather stunning reproductive organs - are still a staple of Puerto Rican radio and television. Logroño also developed his own audio production company, Man-TK Records (Man-TK being a pun on manteca, the Spanish word for lard. Logroño's work is filled with porcine references throughout his career).

=== Sunshine's Café ===
In 1971, the Public Service Commission of Puerto Rico granted the first license to transmit through the cable format to Cable Television Corporation of Puerto Rico. The first attempt failed to become established and in 1977, the corporation was acquired by Cable TV of Greater San Juan. Other companies followed and around 200,000 clients held the basic programming by 1988. The local figures, feeling threatened by the new medium and assuming that cable programming was unavailable to the uneducated, decided to change its programming to include more sexual content and risqué comedies in order to comfort to stereotypes. In 1988 Logroño began hosting a show named Sunshine's Cafe on WAPA-TV. Sunshine's Cafe was very popular among Puerto Rico's television viewers and its risqué sense of humor guaranteed four seasons of high ratings and extreme controversy. After the show's first airing all sponsors except one canceled their contracts, and the program spent close to six months without advertising. The program was controversial because it confronted many Puerto Rican stereotypes head-on. It also provided Logroño with a vehicle to bring in many taboo topics in subtext, a technique that he personally credits Bill Cosby with teaching him when Cosby developed a pilot for a Latino-based series in American television that did not evolve into a series.

In the program, Sunshine played many characters; one particular character portrayed a clever closet homosexual named Vitín Alicea Arévalo, many of whose phrases became household sayings. Another character portrayed a fake Pentecostal minister, El Hermano Emmanuel (Brother Emmanuel), who had a hunch (mirroring that of a famous Puerto Rican minister, Yiye Avila), was constantly angry (as yet another local minister, Jorge Raschke), frequently schemed to profit from the members of his congregation, and almost always was caught doing so. El Hermano Emmanuel constantly spoke trilling r's (and was often referred to as "Hermano Emmanuerrrrr"), and used a phrase mocking speaking in tongues: "¡Salamaya!" (derived from "¡Sea la madre!", or "[Damned] be his mother!") as a punchline, particularly whenever the Hermano met a stunningly attractive woman, or when another character caught him in a profiteering scheme. A famous episode had the Hermano try (unsuccessfully) to cure José Feliciano of his blindness (Feliciano's memorable response was: "I can see! I can see! I can see that you're a fake, I still can't see a damn!).

The phrase "Salamaya" is still used in Puerto Rico to refer in jest to devout Pentecostal followers (Hermano Emmanuel constantly had two naive female parishioners follow him everywhere) or a small Pentecostal congregation (particularly those with rudimentary facilities, such as tents). Rapper René Pérez ("Residente") uses it in the Calle 13" song "Ojalai" to describe the song's attractive female subject in rapture-like amazement.

Offended by Logroño's portrayal of ministers, Pentecostal leaders in Puerto Rico threatened Logroño's program with boycotts, and Raschke and Milton Picón (the local representative for Morality in Media) actually confronted him on television talk shows. On a rare bow to public pressure, Logroño discontinued the character ("If I keep on doing it their followers will lynch me!", he gives as an explanation). Following the first attempt by Sunshine Logroño's Sunshine Café which received the support if advertisers shows like Antonio Sánchez's No te duermas and Raymond Arrieta's ¡Que vacilón! and El show de Raymond followed the same pattern.

During this time, cable still lagged in popularity, present in only a fourth of households. In local channels, advertisers controlled the content of the programming, seeking ratings that would benefit them economically. In 1991, a movement, led by the Catholic Church, led to a series of manifestations by groups that promoted Christian morality and feminism which resulted in local channel promising self-regulation following boycott against risqué programming by a number of advertisers and the government. In the process, A la cama con Porcel was cancelled and restrictions were placed on Sunshine's Café and No te duermas, the first of which was eventually suspended. He would remain off television for five years. In 1994, he appeared in Rafo Muñiz's special, ¿A quién no le falta un tornillo?. On February 3, 1997, he participated in Los 75 años de don Tommy, a special dedicated to Muñiz's career.

=== Chona, La Puerca Asesina ===
In exchange for a cameo in the film "La Guagua Aérea", Logroño somehow persuaded film maker Luis Molina Casanova to direct a satirical action film, "Chona, La Puerca Asesina" ("Chona, The Killer Pig"), released in 1988 and filmed in black and white. Many Puerto Rican artists and media personalities (along with Argentine actor Pablo Alarcón, who played a Puerto Rican peasant with a strong Argentine accent) appeared in the film, in which a piglet grows to become ten stories tall and attacks Puerto Rico, Godzilla-style. Among the cameos and film roles are those played by José Miguel Agrelot, Nena Rivera, Wilson Torres (later known for another comedic character named Maneco), Guillermo José Torres, Enrique Cruz, Antonio Pantojas and others (Ruth Fernández sings the movie's theme, her trademark song "Gracias, Mundo"). Jacobo Morales and Logroño appear as Cornelius Rodas and Igor, respectively; Rodas is responsible for enlarging the pig, as requested by Don Rodriguez, one of Agrelot's many comedic characters. A remasterized version, or director's cut, which adds Vitín Alicea to the plot and features improved sound effects, was released in DVD format in 1998.

In 1991, Logroño had a chance to star in a Hollywood movie: he acted opposite Martin Short and Kurt Russell in Captain Ron. He appeared in the movie Contact, alongside Jodie Foster, as a taxi driver, but actually - thanks to the rather extreme talents of the film's editor, Logroño claims - only his left elbow appears on the screen. He won the audition over Rafael Fuentes much to his dismay.

According to an interview that Logroño gave Vea one time, one day, he arrived at his office to learn there was an audition for another movie. By his own account, he caught a flight to New York City, made the audition, and flew back to Puerto Rico, arriving just in time to participate at a play in Mayagüez.

Logroño attempted to show his serious actor side in the late 1990s, participating in various theater plays.

=== More recent history ===
He was the host of a show named De Noche Con Iris y Sunshine (At Night With Iris & Sunshine), co-hosted by Iris Chacón. When Iris later left the show for personal reasons, it was renamed to De Noche con Sunshine (At Night With Sunshine). In a controversial network switch Sunshine switched to WAPA-TV in 1998 and was the host of a show named Club Sunshine, which was aired until May 2009. During that time in WAPA-TV he was also the vice-president for talent affairs of the television station. Club Sunshine was followed up by Sunshine Remix (later retitled El Remix) and Risas en Combo, both aired on WAPA-TV in an alternating season-wise fashion until both were replaced together by El Remix alone, which still airs on WAPA as of 2019.

On February 25, 2007, Logroño appeared as an archbishop in the filming of the video for Calle 13's "Tango del Pecado", the first featured single of their recent album, "¿Residente o Visitante?". He marries Calle 13's René Pérez and ex-girlfriend Denise Quiñones in a surrealistic wedding where Tego Calderón and Julio Voltio are the best men. On March 21, 2007, Logroño released a children's book, "El coquí que quiso ser sapo" (The coquí who wanted to be a bullfrog), based on a story he once developed and recorded as part of a children stories' album for the Museo del Niño (Children's Museum) in San Juan. A children's musical play based on the book was produced in Puerto Rico in April 2008.

Sunshine has been hosting the afternoon radio show Agitando El Show since 1997, with Fernando Arévalo. The show has one of the biggest audiences and is one of the longest running shows in local radio.

During 2014, Logroño became involved in a dispute with television personality Josué Carrión over a section of Logroño's show, "El Tiempo es Poco", which mocked Carrión's television show El Tiempo Es Oro. Logroño decided to cancel the section, much like during the 1980s, when he had a similar situation in which he mocked journalist and emcee Ivan Frontera, who got murdered early in 1985, causing the cancellation of Logroño's character, "Ivan Fontecha", during Logroño's shows.

== See also ==
- List of Puerto Ricans
- List of Puerto Rican songwriters
