= Macrolane =

Injectable cosmetic filler

Macrolane is a body-contour filler marketed by Q-Med in the UK since early 2008. It claims to be a less invasive alternative to surgical breast enlargement, offering an increase of one cup size through injections that take between 30 and 90 minutes—colloquially referred to as the "30-minute boob job".

More recently, Q-Med have discontinued promoting Macrolane as a breast enhancer due to the lack of consensus amongst radiologists regarding how to examine breasts that have been injected with filler.

== Procedure ==
The treatment involves injecting stabilised hyaluronic acid into the breast, buttock or other areas, and then moulding to the desired shape. The procedures requires a local anaesthetic, and will likely cause bruising, swelling and discomfort for a few days. The effect only lasts for 12 months, after which further injections are required.

== Criticisms ==
The procedure has drawn criticism, as its long-term effects are relatively unknown. The only medical trial was supported by the manufacturers, involving 1000 patients in Japan, and anybody taking the procedure will be entered into a European-wide research trial.

Initially, treatment in the UK cost about £3000 for the initial injections, followed by £1400 for repeat injections each year to maintain the effect.

A recent study showed that Macrolane complications may appear months after treatment, as local infections, product dislocation, and breast lump onset. Ultrasound and MRI help to diagnose the nature of the complication. Patients must be warned that it can be impossible to totally remove Macrolane, once implanted.

In Sweden there have been a number of cases of erection problems and pain associated with erection when injections were used to increase penile size, prompting a mandatory investigation into the safety of the product.
