= El Tiempo Es Oro =

El Tiempo Es Oro may refer to:

- El Tiempo Es Oro (album), by Paulina Rubio
- El Tiempo Es Oro (game show), a Puerto Rican game show
