= Breast implant illness =

- Other names: Autoimmune/autoinflammatory syndrome induced by adjuvants
- Specialty: Gynecology, toxicology
- Symptoms: Arthralgia, chronic fatigue, cognitive dysfunction, dryness of the eyes, dryness of the mouth, myalgia, pyrexia
- Causes: Aggravation of underlying autoimmune diseases caused by silicone breast implants
- Risk factors: Family or personal history of allergies or autoimmune diseases

Breast implant illness (BII), also known as autoimmune/autoinflammatory syndrome induced by adjuvants (ASIA), along with other terms, is a condition that affects certain women with breast implants, with symptoms Its acceptance as a legitimate disease is controversial, but meta-analyses consistently underscore that "women with implants tend to have increases in symptoms and diagnoses compared to similar women in the general population," and that this particularly but not exclusively affects those with underlying allergies or autoimmune diseases. Nonetheless, it remains poorly defined, and its existence has still not been conclusively proven. The idea of BII has existed since the 1960s, but it has more recently been popularized on social media. There are currently no diagnostic criteria nor specific diagnostic tests, thus BII is considered to be a diagnosis of exclusion.

== Treatment for Breast Implant Illness ==
• En Bloc: Involves removing both the implant and the capsule tissue surrounding it in one piece. The idea is to eliminate any potential toxins or inflammatory cells that might be contributing to symptoms.

• Non-En Bloc: Involves removing the implant but leaving the surrounding capsule tissue, which may still harbor inflammation or bacteria, but not necessarily in a manner that causes ongoing symptoms.

Studies have found that women who undergo both en bloc explantation or non-en bloc explantation both report significant improvements in symptoms, including fatigue, brain fog, joint pain, and other BII-related issues.
