= Trans-umbilical breast augmentation =

- Specialty: Plastic surgery

Trans-umbilical breast augmentation (TUBA) is a type of breast augmentation in which breast implants are placed through an incision at the navel rather than the chest.

== History ==
In 1964, the American plastic surgeons T.D. Cronin and F.J. Gerow reported the first breast augmentation procedure using silicone gel-filled implants. In that implantation procedure, the breast implant devices were inserted through an incision to the inframammary fold (IMF), where the breast meets the chest of the woman.

In 1972, J. Jenny described a periareolar-incision emplacement technique for inserting the breast implants via an incision under the nipple-areola complex (NAC).

In 1973, Koeller described a transaxillary breast implant emplacement technique effected by means of an incision to the axilla.

In 1991 the trans-umbilical breast augmentation was invented and first performed by Dr. Gerald W. Johnson in Houston Texas. T.U.B.A is a technique for the implantation of saline breast implants through a small incision at the woman's navel. The trans-umbilical emplacement approach is a technical variant of the abdominal tunnel technique employed for inserting breast implants, which was described in 1976, which facilitated the inserting and emplacing of empty saline implants to the breast-implant pocket.

== Surgical technique ==
A trans-umbilical breast augmentation is a breast prosthesis insertion technique wherein the incision is at the umbilicus (navel), which dissection then tunnels superiorly, to facilitate emplacing the breast prosthesis to the implant pocket without producing visible surgical scars upon the breast hemisphere; but it makes appropriate dissection and device-emplacement more technically difficult. A TUBA procedure is performed bluntly (without endoscopic assistance), and is inapplicable to emplacing (pre-filled) silicone-gel implants, because of the great potential for damaging the elastomer silicone shell of the breast-implant device during its manual insertion through the short, two-centimetre (3/4"), incision at the navel, and because pre-filled silicone-gel implants are incompressible, and cannot be inserted through so small an incision.

Advantages

The scar is produced in a remote location (the navel).

Disadvantages

The TUBA (Trans-umbilical Breast Augmentation) approach is inapplicable for the emplacement of incompressible, pre-filled breast implants, usually of the silicone-gel-filled variety. There is felt to be somewhat less precision with this approach in developing the breast pocket as compared to traditional incisions. Future surgeries or difficulties encountered during the initial surgery likely need to be addressed through a different incision.

But a Taiwan surgeon Huang Hong Ming had published a case of revisional endoscopic TUBA replacing the implants up to 790cc along with inferior reinforcement using biodegradable mesh GalaFLEX successfully in IMCAS bangkok 2026.

== See also ==
- Breast
- Breast augmentation (Augmentation mammoplasty)
- Breast reconstruction
- Mammoplasty
- Mastopexy (breast lift)
