= Polypropylene breast implant =

Continuously expanding breast implant

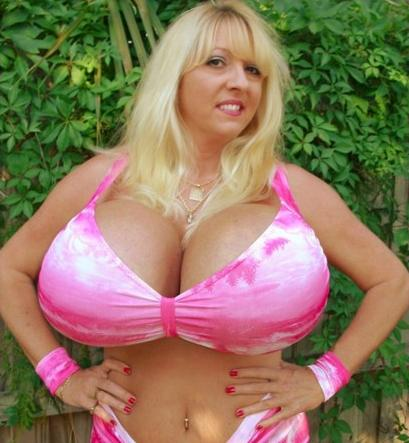
Maxi Mounds, an adult entertainer with polypropylene breast implants

Polypropylene breast implants, also known as string breast implants, are a form of breast implant using polypropylene developed by Gerald W. Johnson. Due to a number of medical complications, the device has not been approved in the European Union or the United States.

Polypropylene implants absorb water very slowly, about <0.01% in 24 hours. The polypropylene, which is yarn-like, causes irritation to the implant pocket which causes the production of serum which fills the implant pocket on a continual basis. This causes continuous expansion of the breast after surgery. Growth can only be alleviated by removal of serum by syringe. Problems can also arise if the breasts enlarge at different rates. This can be corrected by removal of serum or introduction of sterile saline. Continual breast growth will eventually result in "extreme, almost cartoonish breast sizes."

String implants were only available for a very short time in the US before being removed from the market by the FDA around 2001.

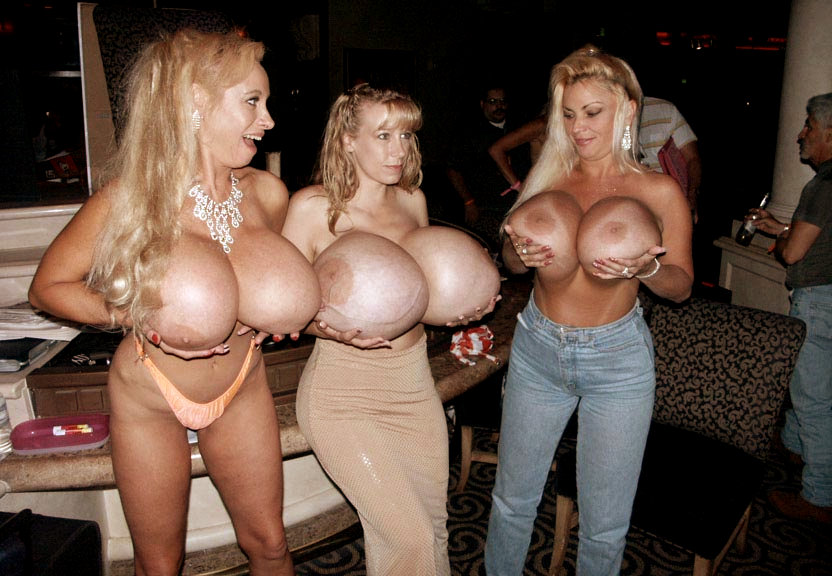
Chelsea Charms (middle), who has polypropylene breast implants, standing alongside Echo Valley (left) & Colt 45 (right).

Polypropylene implants have created some of the largest recorded increases in breast size due to surgical augmentation. They are rarely seen outside the adult entertainment industry. Big-bust entertainers Chelsea Charms, Maxi Mounds, Kayla Kleevage, Minka, Elizabeth Starr, and Teddi Barrett are some recipients of polypropylene breast implants.
