= Vitín Alicea =

Fictional Puerto Rican television character, portrayed by Sunshine Logroño

- Sunshine Café character
- First appearance: 1989
- Created by: Sunshine Logroño
- Portrayed by: Sunshine Logroño
- Voiced by: Sunshine Logroño

In-universe information
- Full name: Víctor Alicea Arévalo
- Alias: Yuca Vitín
- Gender: Male
- Occupation: Gym owner, singer, radio personality
- Nationality: Puerto Rican

Víctor Alicea Arévalo, better known as Vitín Alicea, is a fictional comedic character created and portrayed by Sunshine Logroño. Created in the mid-1980s, Vitín remains a popular radio and television character in Puerto Rico. He has appeared in Logroño's previous television programs "Sunshine's Café" and "De Noche Con Sunshine", "Club Sunshine", and currently appears sporadically in "Sunshine Remix", a program aired on WAPA-TV, a station for which Logroño is vice president for talent affairs. Vitín also appears regularly on Agitando El Show, a late afternoon radio program on Cadena Salsoul, one of Puerto Rico's salsa radio networks.

== Biography ==
Vitín Alicea is a resident of the coastal Puerto Nuevo barrio of Vega Baja, Puerto Rico. He is allegedly the first cousin ("primo coyunto") of Logroño's partner in the radio program "Agitando, El Show", Fernando Arévalo (and Arévalo follows the joke when pressed).

Vitín owns a makeshift gymnasium in the backyard of his house, called "Musculus", which is merely a converted garage. Since he's not wealthy, his weightlifting equipment consists of portland cement molded inside cracker tin cans and linked by galvanized aluminum tubes, similar to what Fred Flintstone would use to lift weights. It also features a legendary garden hose, which Vitín dutifully uses to shower the inevitably all-male visitors to his gym (he constantly claimed his gym is the cleanest in town). He also has a makeshift ring in his gym, with rope and posts he purchased at a hardware store and foam he purchased at an upholstery store. Arévalo, Vitín's radio sidekick, usually complains about Vitín removing the doors from the urinals, to which Vitín simply replies that they are not needed.

Vitín is depicted as doggedly persistent and successful in anything he puts his mind into, as long as things do not go wrong (when they do, a comic sketch is born). As a result of his blatant passing and manipulative character, however, there is no known sexual or romantic partner of Vitín's, male or female. This gives the impression that Vitín, as clever as he is, is a perennial loner.

== Personal life ==
Whenever Vitín is not featured in a proper comedy sketch, he has a habit of receiving famous visitors to his establishments, in both his radio and his television shows. He once hosted a section on "Club Sunshine" called "Desde mi ring con Vitín" ("From My Ring With Vitín") to sketch these interviews, and used Queen's "We Will Rock You" (played by the program's house band) as a theme song. Inevitably the guest is a male, and Vitín typically hugs and pats (or even pets) him, which inevitably shocks the guest. He would progressively make flattering comments to his guests, which may turn to passes if the guest is not careful. However, one of Vitín's trade moves is to ask questions about the guest's personal liking and agree with whatever the guest says, even self-contradicting himself or his values if the guest says something that Vitín has not expected. For example, Vitín might go to the extreme of saying he hates wrestling if his male guest doesn't like the sport. Usually the interview ends with a blatant passing or physical gesture that embarrasses the guest (a typical one is Vitín standing up, turning around and pump up his muscles with his backside to the guest, flaunting his derriere to him). Usually guests play along until they cannot follow the joke any longer. A willing participant in the joke is Chayanne, who has visited Vitín twice.

=== Sexual orientation ===
Vitín is a hyper-macho misogynist (and very probably a closet homosexual, although this has never been proven) who openly derides homosexuals (a la Roy Cohn) but will discreetly make a pass to many a man who approaches him. Vitín does not spare a second to flaunt his masculinity to the point of self-parody. He is an extreme fan of professional wrestling, weightlifting and film. In actuality, Vitín has always complained of having a pot belly, although he claims to take good care of his "temple", his body (using Saint Paul's verbal analogy). This is actually said in jest, since Logroño occasionally makes jokes about being overweight when he is off character.

=== Despise of women ===
A traumatic event happened early in Vitín's life that explains his misogyny to some extent. He claimed that girls at his high school would make passes at him, and would ask him to dance with them on short notice as to have him demonstrate his dancing skills, something that he felt uneasy doing. These same girls persuaded him to decorate the high school's gymnasium for a school dance, only to not show up at the crucial hours before it. He reluctantly had to set up the entire gym alone (feeling that he had been tricked into doing the work alone), and had to endure the teasing of his male friends, who made fun of his "interior decorator" skills. Since then, Vitín openly despises women. He takes his misogyny to the extreme, to the point of telling almost all his guests and friends that women carry sexually transmitted diseases that they transmit to men, and that because of this, they cannot be trusted. Occasionally, when a woman arrived where Vitín was at, he would say in a loud voice "¡Infección a la vista!" ("Infection in sight!"), implying that any woman approaching him or other men was carrying an STD. He usually advised King Cabra to not get close to women, but at the end of each sketch, King Cabra never paid any attention and would leave with the lady.

Vitín's attacks on women were harsher on the early days of the character, but Logroño has since toned down the character's criticism towards females.

== Development ==
In early airings of the character, since Logroño was considerably thinner than he currently is, Vitín constantly wore a muscle shirt bearing one of Leonardo da Vinci's anatomic sketches that displayed a man's muscles. Logroño has since physically outgrown the shirt, and now wears other clothes, but tends to gravitate towards a skeleton shirt. He also wears a beret.

Logroño over-modulates his voice when representing Vitín to make him sound like a radio announcer at times: Vitín speaks with a baritone voice, has perfect Spanish language diction (using Castilian phonemes at times, particularly a strong j sound that almost sounds like a "kh"), and constantly utters a "Hmm?" to punctuate most sentences, which he sometimes enunciates as questions. He calls those males that he likes "Papa", a term that has become a comical verbal jab in Puerto Rico against any male who shows his masculinity in public in a blatant way. ("Papa" is actually a term used by natives of the United States Virgin Islands to refer to Puerto Ricans)

== Vitín's Q&A ==
Sometimes Vitín recites a long exchange of questions and answers that has become an audience favorite. He may either expect the responses from either his guest (which may or may not be familiar with the exchange) or his studio audience (who usually do know it by heart; as the audience is not supposed to participate in programs Vitín claims the next-door neighbors are the ones who respond) The exchange goes like this:

"Mi manguera es tu manguera / ¿Con la fría o la caliente? / ¿Y cómo hay que estar? / ¡Ahí! / El buffet... / ...está servido / ¿Te lo agrando? / A 30... / Mangueras unidas... / ...jamas serán vencidas / Ah... / ¡qué rico! / ¡La Marina... / ...fuera de Vieques! / Machos... / ¡AHI! (the last two repeated at least three times)

This roughly translates to:

"My garden hose is your garden hose... / Do you fancy cold or hot (water)? / And where are we supposed to be? / Right there! / Buffet... / ...is served! / You want a bigger combo? / (Large size, costing) 30 (cents)... / Hoses united... / ...will never be defeated! / Ah... / how delicious! / The United States Navy... / ...out of Vieques!* / (Where are the) Machos...(?) / HERE! (the last two repeated at least three times)

The exchange was assembled little by little over the years, and can be explained this way:

- "Mi manguera es tu manguera" is supposedly Vitín's term of endearment to someone he likes, a double entendre parody of the common Spanish phrase: "Mi casa es su casa". The option of hot or cold water was supposedly the options available to anyone who showers with Vitín's legendary garden hose.
- Exchanges that have "¡Ahi!" as a response are based on the typical chants of labor protesters on strike in Puerto Rico
- "Buffet is served" is a veiled reference to a potential male gay orgy
- The reference to 30 cents is taken from typical fast-food menus, which the consumer can "biggie size" after paying, stereotypically, 30 cents
- "Hoses united..." is a parody on the usual Latin American chant of leftist protestors, "El pueblo, unido, jamás será vencido!" ("A people united will never be defeated", which rhymes in Spanish)
- The Navy reference referred to the common plea of Puerto Ricans to have the United States Navy vacate their military activities in the island of Vieques. Since the Navy left Vieques, this part of the rant has been removed from the exchange.
- "¡Ah, qué rico!" comes from a sound bite uttered once by Donato, of the Miami-based Latino music duo Donato y Estéfano. Donato was pleasantly surprised by the screaming women in his audience in one of Logroño's television shows, but since the duo was reportedly ambiguous sexually, the quote was often played whenever Vitín wanted to make fun of anything remotely sexual in his sketch.

== Singing career ==
Vitín has recorded various songs, some of which have become cultural references. He remade Marisol Calero's song "Duendes de la noche" ("Elves of the Night") and turned into "Hombres en la Noche" ("Men In The Night"), a song where he longs for male company and pays homage to Puerto Rican wrestling hero Carlitos Colón (who once had the song sung to him in a Vitín episode and only provided a deadpan stare as a response). The song has since become an unofficial party anthem, and has been remixed at least once. It was sung once by Danny Rivera on a memorable Vitín episode.

Vitín also recorded "El Mejor Regalo" ("The Best Gift"), in which he asks his mother to give him videotapes of wrestling matches as a Christmas gift. He later recorded a bachata, "¿Pa' qué rayos la mujer?" ("Why in hell are there any women?"), in which he equaled women to trouble.

== Relationship with wrestling ==
Vitín has been a patron of sorts for professional wrestling in Puerto Rico. He is reportedly the biggest fan of Carlitos Colón, who has played along with the joke, sometimes reluctantly (see above) Vitín has intervened in wrestling matches, and has even been physically attacked by the occasional wrestling heel in television interviews featuring wrestlers.

The whole concept of Vitín owning a gym on the first place was supposedly an excuse to have potential wrestlers train at his house, where he could manipulate them psychologically. He called himself a "Ternerito Trainer" ("Ternerito" meaning a male calf), for he fancied candidates in the youngish side. Most candidates either fled the place immediately or did pay their cheap dues given the rudimentary quality of the gym's equipment. Two of them deserve mention, since they became Vitín's protegés.

== Sidekicks ==
=== King Cabra ===
King Cabra was played by Puerto Rican cuatro musician Pedro Guzmán, who was a regular player in the Sunshine's Café house band. King Cabra was a rather naive gym member who sincerely befriended Vitín and did not understand his sexual advances. He did wonder why Vitín would all of a sudden lecture him about STD's, emphasizing the role of women as vectors. At times Vitín would get into trouble, and King Cabra would save him from a thrashing due to his excellent wrestling skills. However, given Vitín's strict celibacy requirements as a pre-requisite for training, King Cabra eloped with Kenya, the Haitian fire-eater at the Gurabo, Puerto Rico Patron Saint feasts. This caused Vitín considerable strife, since he considered King to be his "hermano putativo" ("putative brother", a phrase Logroño uses as a comic device, since "puta" is the vulgar Spanish term for a prostitute)

Guzmán's affable character, high pitched voice and short height helped give the character a likable quality, and therefore King Cabra became an audience favorite, getting standing ovations from the program's audience whenever he appeared. When Guzmán left the program to pursue his solo career, the character ended with his departure.

=== Culebro Mendoza ===
Culebro Mendoza is Vitín's current sidekick, and is played by Jesús Muñoz, a production assistant of Logroño's turned comedian. Culebro first appeared as an extra in the video for the Vitín song "¿Pa' qué rayos la mujer?" (see above), where he sang background and wiggled in a "snake dance" along with the music. The snake ("culebra" in Spanish) dancer caught the public's attention, and Logroño incorporated him into Vitín's sketches.

Culebro is heterosexual (as was King Cabra). He was portrayed originally as an illegal immigrant from the Cibao region of the Dominican Republic that needed immigration papers once he arrived to Puerto Rico, and Vitín provided these. Under protests from the Dominican community in Puerto Rico the story was revisited to portray Culebro as a native of Trinidad and Tobago that spent various years serving as a sailor for a ship based in the Dominican Republic and who learned Spanish with a heavy "cibaeño" accent.

Since reaching Puerto Rico, Culebro has (either naively or because of necessity) remained in Vitín's "stable" through the years, serving as a janitor at the Musculus gym. Due to his rather spartan living conditions and schedule, Culebro longs for female company, to which Vitín vehemently objects. Culebro displayed his talents for singing bachata in an episode, and audience reaction was positive enough to deserve a recording, a CD album named "Culebro Legal". Two minor hits from this album were the reggaeton/plena fusion song "Seaca Bós"(see video) (the stereotypical Cibaeño pronunciation for "Se acabó", or "It's Over") and "Los deítos 'e los pies" ("The toes"), in which Culebro describes his likings for a lover's toes as a fetish. Both were minor Christmas hits in Puerto Rico in 2004, and "Seaca Bós" has been used as a wrestling theme song. Vitín has since become Culebro's agent, charging him an 80% fee for managing his career, which ensures Culebro's reluctant involuntary servitude at Vitín's gym for years to come.

== Yuca Vitín e Indio Nando ==
For a while in their afternoon radio program, Logroño and Arévalo featured a comedy sketch, "Yuca Vitín e Indio Nando", in which they parodied Native American stereotypes prevalent in old American television series, but using local Puerto Rican references instead. Many of these programs portrayed "indians" as speaking broken English which, translated into Spanish, made no grammatical sense. Since many of these programs were dubbed in Mexico, Arévalo played his Indio Nando character speaking with a Mexican accent, in a way similar to the dubbed Spanish version of Baba Looey (called "Pepe Luis" in Spanish) shown in local television airings of Quick Draw McGraw cartoons. Very often Yuca Vitín would joke about how stupid the stereotypes were and how silly would the script to the section be.

Yuca Vitín and Indio Nando had a rather constant routine: they opened telephone lines to ask listeners to suggest a public Puerto Rican personality annoying enough to be either scalped or flogged. Since their time reference frame was 1493 (the year when Puerto Rico was "discovered" by Christopher Columbus' naval crews), they answered "the spirits talking over the magic stone" (i.e. the voice at the speaker phone) very reverently. Once the audience agreed on a candidate, Yuca Vitín and Indio Nando would simulate a hunt for the character, complete with jungle sound effects, a verbal description of the celebrity using archaic language references (i.e., a celebrity with breast implants would be called "She Who Has Basketballs in Her Chest") screams of the reportedly captured celebrity while being tortured, and perhaps an unexpected comic reaction (like, for example, should the celebrity wear a wig, having him or her flee the scene while Yuca Vitín held over his or her wig).

The Yuca Vitín and Indio Nando sketches are rarely performed today, but they are revived occasionally, even on the occasional television show.

== Controversies ==
=== Name ===
Vitín Alicea is commonly named Vitín and not Víctor since there is already another actor and comedian named Víctor Alicea. There was speculation that the character's name was a jab at Alicea but this was disproved when the Alicea's character, Guille, and Logroño's Vitín had a dance duel on an episode of Sunshine's Café.

=== Portrayal of homosexuality ===
According to Logroño, Vitín Alicea attempts to portray an alternate view of homosexuality that is not necessarily well understood elsewhere. Instead of the effeminate stereotypical characters that are commonplace in Latin American comedy, Vitín's hyper-macho stance was shocking to many during the character's early run. Gay activists in Puerto Rico have attacked Vitín as being an even worse creation than the stereotype. Logroño counters saying that, during a visit to a public school, some students approached him and told him their physical education teacher made passes similar to Vitín's; by this he implied that the character was merely a humorous take on something that naturally occurs in Puerto Rican society.
