= Agitando El Show =

- Running time: 2 hours
- Country of origin: Puerto Rico
- Home station: SalSoul
- Starring: Sunshine Logroño; Fernando Arévalo
- Original release: 1997 – 2020
- Website: Official website

Agitando El Show was an afternoon radio show that aired on Cadena SalSoul. The show started airing on 1997 and was silently taken off the air in 2020. It was one of the highest audience afternoon radio shows on the island.

The show was hosted by Fernando Arévalo and comedian Sunshine Logroño, who appeared as various of his characters, namely Eleuterio Quiñones and Vitín Alicea. The show featured political analysis and discussion, news, and other sections.
