= Vincenz Czerny =

German Bohemian surgeon

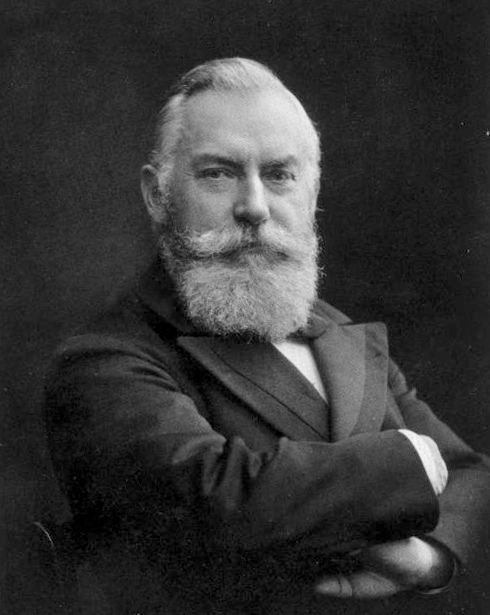
- Born: 19 November 1842; Trutnov, Bohemia, Austrian Empire
- Died: 3 October 1916 (aged 73); Heidelberg, Baden-Württemberg, German Empire
- Medical career
- Profession: Surgeon
- Sub-specialties: Oncology, gynecology

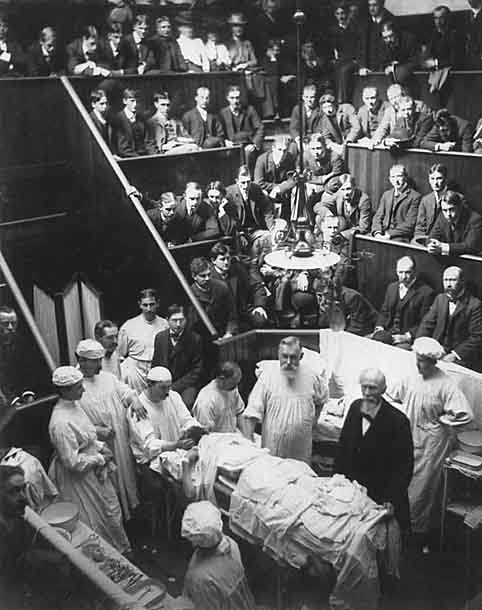
Czerny as surgeon

Vincenz Czerny (19 November 1842 – 3 October 1916) was a German Bohemian surgeon whose main contributions were in the fields of oncological and gynecological surgery.

Czerny was born in Trutnov, Bohemia, Austrian Empire. He initially studied at Karl-Ferdinand University in Prague, later transferring to the University of Vienna, where he was a student of Ernst Wilhelm von Brücke (1819–1892). In 1866 he graduated summa cum laude. Afterwards, he remained in Vienna as an assistant to Johann Ritter von Oppolzer (1808–1871) and Theodor Billroth (1829–1894). In 1871 he became a clinical director at the University of Freiburg.

In 1877 Czerny was appointed professor at Heidelberg, where he succeeded surgeon Gustav Simon (1824–1876). In 1906 he founded the Institut für Experimentelle Krebsforschung (Institute for Experimental Cancer Research), which was a forerunner to today's German Cancer Research Center (DKFZ) in Heidelberg. Here he established a hospital for 47 cancer patients, known as the Samariterhaus (Samaritan House).

Czerny developed operational techniques for cancer surgery. He is also remembered for his treatment of patients with inoperable cancer. In 1887 Czerny performed the first open partial nephrectomy for renal carcinoma.

Czerny made contributions to other surgical fields, including a new radical operation for inguinal hernia, a pyelolithotomy for kidney stone disease, and in 1879 performed the first total hysterectomy via the vagina. He has been called the "father of cosmetic breast surgery": in 1895 he published the first account of a breast implant which he had carried out, by moving a benign lipoma to "avoid asymmetry" after removing a tumor in a patient's breast.

In 1901 Czerny was president of the German Society of Surgery, and in 1908 was president of the International Surgical Congress. His father-in-law was renowned German physician, Adolf Kussmaul (1822–1902). He died in Heidelberg, Baden-Württemberg, German Empire.
