= Josué Carrión =

Puerto Rican businessman, singer and television game show host

Josue Carrion (born c. 1978) is a Puerto Rican businessman. He was also the show host of the television show, El Tiempo Es Oro. On December 19, 2014, that show was cancelled by Puerto Rican television channel, WAPA America. On November 16, 2015, Carrion returned to television in the United States and Puerto Rico, as host of Mega-TV's show, "Sales de Oro".

== Biography ==
During 2014, Carrion became involved in a dispute with Sunshine Logroño, a well known Puerto Rican comedian and actor who imitated Carrion on one of his television shows.

Carrion lives in El Condado, San Juan.

During 2016, Carrion declared himself bankrupt.

Carrion returned to Puerto Rican television on 1 March 2022, on a TeleOnce show named "La Boveda de Mr. Cash" ("Mr. Cash's Vault"). That show was, however, cancelled on August of that year.

== Arrest ==
On May 28, 2014, Josue Carrion was arrested by the FBI at Luis Muñoz Marín International Airport in San Juan after trying to board a flight to New York City. He was accused of trying to bring a loaded weapon on board a commercial aircraft. WAPA-TV announced that his program would go on, but that Carrion would be substituted by two, possibly three, co-workers as show host of El Tiempo es Oro. However, after the announcement, Carrion met with Joe Ramos, WAPA-TV's president, and they agreed that Carrion would only take a week off and return to the show on June 9, 2014.

On October 22, 2014, Carrion was declared not guilty of all charges.

== Personal ==
Carrion has a sister, Jeanie Carrion, who was once a television model on several shows, such as Joaquín Monserrat's Contra el Reloj, Héctor Marcano's Que Suerte (both Josue and Jeanie participated in this show), Daniela Droz's Es Ahora que Eh and Raymond and Dagmar's show Dia a Dia.

== See also ==
- List of Puerto Ricans
