= French Hospital (Manhattan) =

Former hospital in Manhattan, New York

French and Polytechnic Medical School and Health Center
- Société Française de Bienfaisance (French Benevolent Society)
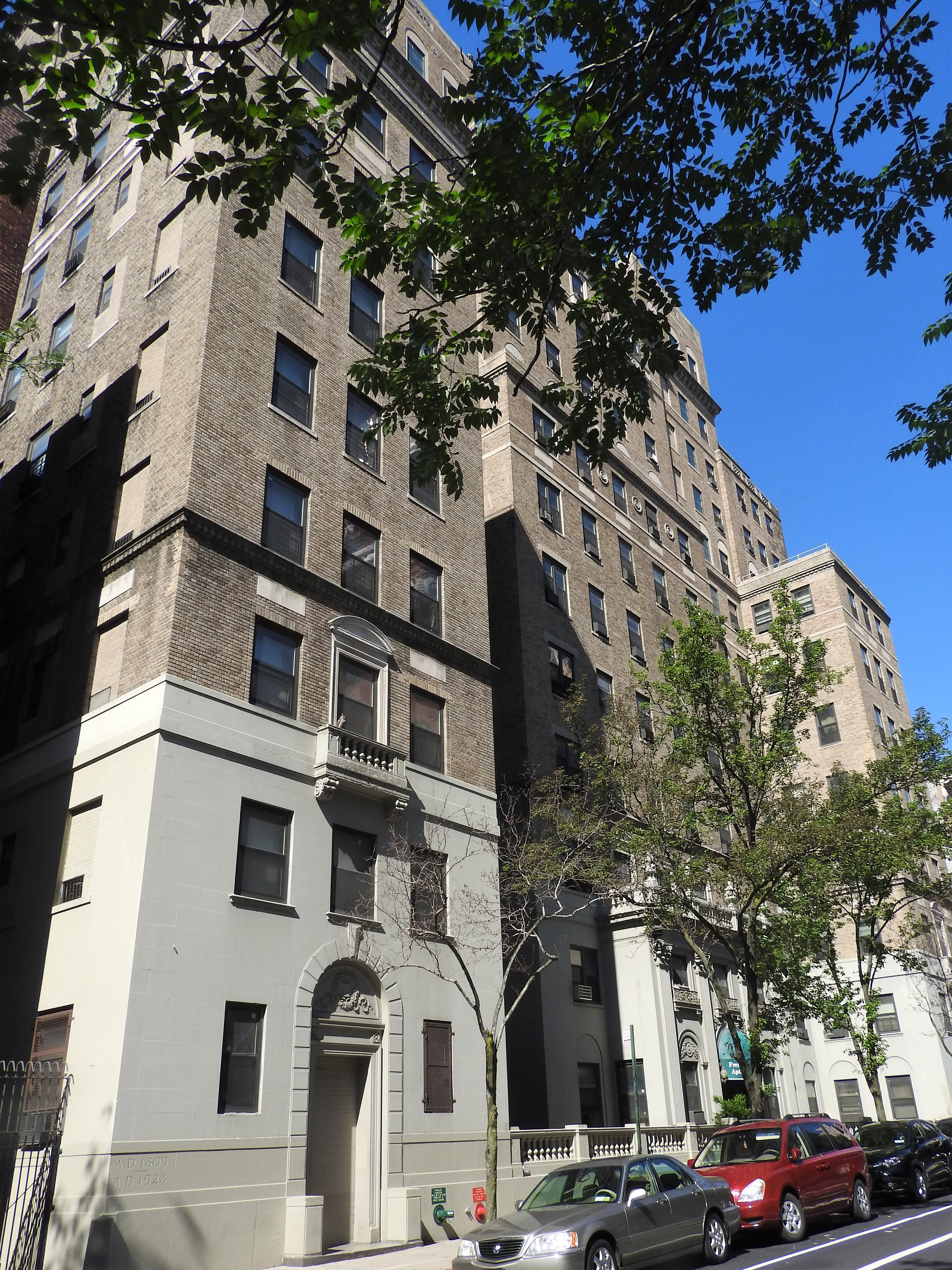
- 330 West 30th Street

Geography
- Location: 330 West 30th Street, Manhattan, New York, United States

Organization
- Type: General
- Religious affiliation: Roman Catholic
- Affiliated university: Polyclinic Medical School and Health Center
- Network: Sisters of the Holy Cross

History
- Former name: French Hospital of New York
- Opened: 1881 (original West 14th Street location), 1928 (329 West 30th Street building)
- Closed: May 13, 1977

Links
- Lists: Hospitals in New York State
- Other links: Hospitals in Manhattan

French Hospital of New York, at 330 West 30th Street (between Eighth and Ninth Avenues), was a hospital established in 1881 and closed in 1977. The last building it occupied was built in 1928 by the Société Française de Bienfaisance (French Benevolent Society). It was in the Chelsea neighborhood. At its opening, it was operated by the Sisters of the Holy Cross. Its owner, the French Benevolent Society, merged with the Polyclinic Medical School and Health Center in 1969. The French and Polytechnic Medical School and Health Center closed May 13, 1977 for a lack of funding.

== History ==
The building replaced the French Hospital facilities at 450 West 34th Street (erected in 1904), 230 West 34th Street (acquired in 1888), and original French Hospital on West 14th Street (built in 1881) – then the city's French section. The hospital closed in the 1960s and in 1981 became residential rentals under Section 8.

The New York City French Hospital was founded in 1880 by doctors Julio J. Henna, Chauveau, Deberceau, Muvial, and Ferrer. Dr. Henna, who was also a member of the medical faculty at Bellevue Hospital, became medical director of the institution.

In the novel The Godfather, Vito Corleone's gunshot wounds are treated at the French Hospital.

== Bibliography ==
- French Hospital (New York, N.Y.) (1932). Formulary of the French Hospital, 56 pp. OCLC 23148223
- French Hospital of the French Benevolent Society of New York (1950). The French Hospital, New York: The Society, 14 pp. OCLC 40600758
- Nagel, Joseph Darwin (1962). The French Hospital, New York: 1889-1900, New York, 8 pp. (reprinted from the Academy Bookman, v. 15, no. 1, pp. 2–9, 1962) OCLC 58765331
