= Chelsea Charms =

American actress

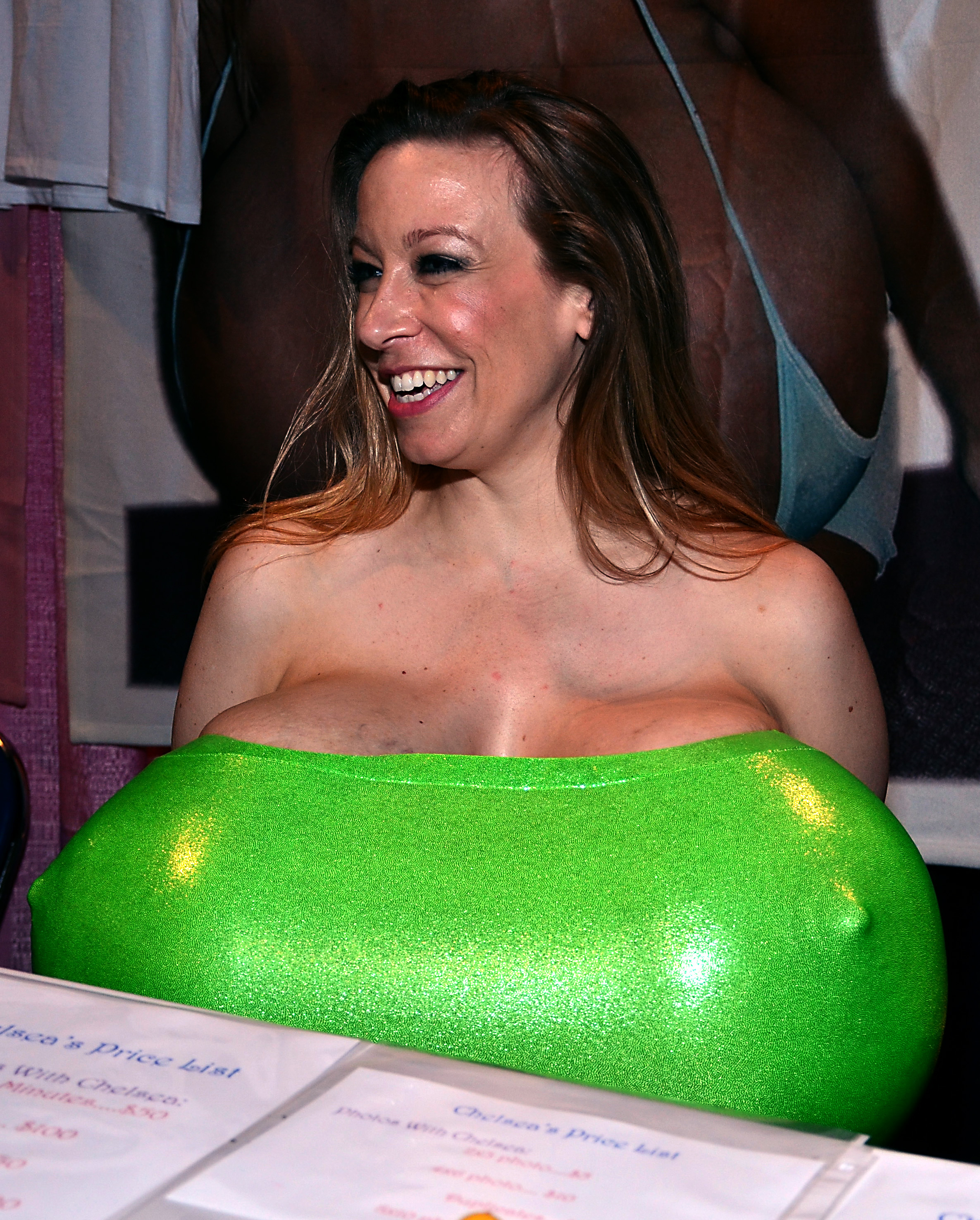
- Charms in 2011
- Born: 1975 or 1976 (age 50–51); Twin Cities, Minnesota, U.S.
- Website: www.chelseacharms.com

Chelsea Charms (born 1975 or 1976) is an American exotic dancer who is known for having extremely large breasts.

== Biography ==
Charms has appeared in adult magazines specializing in large-breasted models. She also has appeared on TV and radio shows, as well as at adult-themed conventions.

During a television interview on the set of This Morning in May 2011, Charms told the hosts of the show that her bust size was then "164XXX, with each implant weighing 26 pounds". She has since reported that their continued growth has increased the weight of each breast to 30 pounds (14 kg) as of summer 2012, and subsequently stated on her website news/blog FAQ page that the implants had grown to 40 pounds each. She has stated that the size of her breasts causes her no back pain, and that she does exercise to strengthen her back.

Charms has had breast augmentation surgery three times. The first augmentation enlarged her to a 36 DD cup, the second to a HH. Both were saline bags. The third surgery implanted the polypropylene string, which has since been abandoned as a common procedure in the United States and the European Union because of the potentially unlimited growth side effect, but has been used in breast enhancement surgery procedures in South America. More specifically, in some cases of breast augmentation via the polypropylene method, the breasts may grow at different paces and at sometimes dangerously accelerated rates. In her case, they have grown in unison, but their growth rate has steadily slowed over the years. The initial string content was equivalent to 2500cc. Her doctor estimates the growth has increased the size of each breast to over 15,000cc as of October 2011. She stated on her website news/blog FAQ page that this number had increased to 18,000cc as of summer 2014 and then to 21,000 cc as of December 2014.

Charms was a subject for British artist Marc Quinn's body of work on people who manipulate their bodies.
