= Julio J. Henna =

Puerto Rican politician (1848–1924)

José Julio Henna Pérez
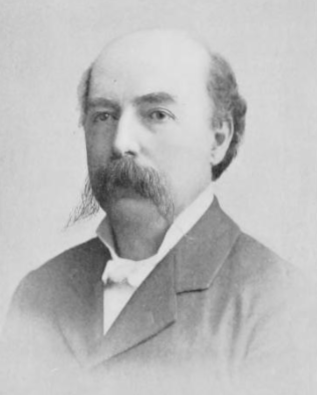
- Born: 24 May 1848; Ponce, Puerto Rico
- Died: 2 February 1924 (aged 75); New York City, NY US
- Education: Columbia University (MD)
- Years active: 1872–1924
- Known for: Co-founder of the New York City French Hospital, Co-founder of the Puerto Rico section of the Cuban Revolutionary Party in New York
- Spouse: Ada Bush Henna
- Medical career
- Profession: Physician
- Institutions: New York City French Hospital, Bellevue Hospital.

Julio J. Henna (24 May 1848 – 2 February 1924) was a Puerto Rican physician and political figure. Henna participated in the founding of the Puerto Rico Section of the Cuban Revolutionary Party in New York as part of the section's faction that supported the annexation of Puerto Rico to the United States.

== Early years ==
Jose Julio Henna Perez was born at 24 Isabel street in Ponce, Puerto Rico, on 24 May 1848. His parents were Jose Henna Darricot – an Englishman – and Maria del Rosario Perez y Garcia, a Puerto Rican member of the privileged upper class.

== Political incursion ==
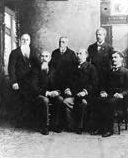
Julio J. Henna (seated, center) shown with the Puerto Rican Revolutionary Committee in New York in 1895

When he was twenty years old, Henna designed a plan to liberate Puerto Rico from Spanish colonialism. The plan failed when the authorities discovered it and he was jailed as a result. However, he was set free through the general amnesty which followed the Spanish revolution, which also ended the reign of Queen Isabel II. In spite of this, in 1869 General Sanz stated to Henna that it would be best if he left the Island. Henna moved to New York and studied medicine at Columbia University, earning his medical degree on 23 February 1872. From New York, Henna continued to support the cause of independence for Puerto Rico.

== Career ==
In 1880, Henna founded, together with Drs. Chauveau, Deberceau, Muvial, and Ferrer, the New York City French Hospital at 330 West 30th street. He became medical director of the institution and was a member of the medical faculty at Bellevue Hospital.

== Death ==
Henna died on 2 February 1924. He was laid to rest at Panteón Nacional Román Baldorioty de Castro in Ponce, Puerto Rico.

== Legacy ==
A street in the city of Ponce is named after Dr. Julio J. Henna. It intersects Calle Dr. Virgilio Biaggi, in the Extension Mariani sector of Barrio Canas Urbano. A gold pendant believed to have belonged to Ponce area cacique Agueybana, and acquired by Dr. Henna, was displayed at the Gabinete de Lectura de Ponce around 1910, and is currently on display at the Smithsonian Institution.

== See also ==
- List of Puerto Ricans
