= El Tiempo Es Oro (game show) =

Puerto Rican television game show

El Tiempo es Oro was a Puerto Rican television game show, hosted by Josue Carrion, nicknamed "Mr. Cash" because of the type of business he runs apart from the show, several pawn shops. The show was shown on WAPA-TV in Puerto Rico and on WAPA America in the United States.

== History ==
Josue Carrion began participating in different television shows, such as "Que Suerte!" and "Pegate al Mediodia" when WAPA-TV's directors offered him to host his own show, beginning in 2012. Carrion participated in television shows as a way of promoting his business, a chain of stores named "Oro Centro", which has 9 locations through Puerto Rico.

El Tiempo Es Oro began being transmitted in 2012, and in 2014, it went on tour, "El Tiempo es Oro Tour" taking the show to various towns in Puerto Rico, from where it would be transmitted live.

On December 19, 2014, it was announced that the show would no longer be shown on WAPA-TV or WAPA-America. The last showing on those channels featured a large party in which children received toys, food was served and every game contestant took home prices. Carrion implied he hopes to bring the show back to television with another channel, saying that neither he nor his show "would be stopped". Eventually, he returned to television with another show, named "Sales de Oro", on November 16, 2015.
