= Breast implant =

Prosthesis used to change the size, shape, and contour of a person's breast

- Surgeon drawing lines on a patient to indicate where implants go.

A breast implant is a prosthesis used to change the size, shape, and contour of a person's breast. In reconstructive plastic surgery, breast implants can be placed to restore a natural-looking breast following a mastectomy, to correct congenital defects and deformities of the chest wall or, cosmetically, to enlarge the appearance of the breast through breast augmentation surgery.

Complications of implants may include breast pain, rashes, skin changes, infection, rupture, cosmetic changes to the breasts such as asymmetry and hardness, and a fluid collection around the breast.

A rare complication associated with textured surfaced implants and polyurethane foam-covered implants is a type of lymphoma (cancer of the immune system) known as breast implant-associated anaplastic large-cell lymphoma (BIA-ALCL).

There are four general types of breast implants, defined by their filler material: saline solution, silicone gel, structured and composite filler. The saline implant has an elastomer silicone shell filled with sterile saline solution during surgery; the silicone implant has an elastomer silicone shell pre-filled with viscous silicone gel; structured implants use nested elastomer silicone shells and two saline-filled lumen; and the alternative composition implants featured miscellaneous fillers, such as hydrogel, soy oil or polypropylene string.

In surgical practice, for the reconstruction of a breast, the tissue expander device is a temporary breast prosthesis used to form and establish an implant pocket for the future permanent breast implant. For the correction of male breast defects and deformities, the pectoral implant is the breast prosthesis used for the reconstruction and the aesthetic repair of a man's chest wall (see: gynecomastia and mastopexy).

== Uses ==
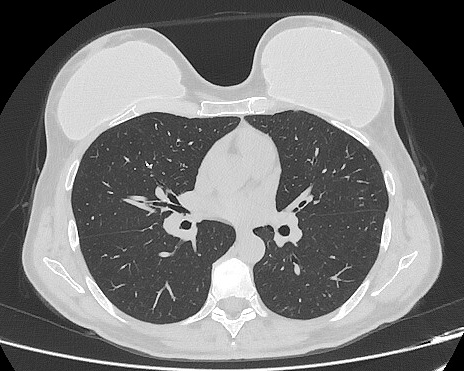
Computed tomography of a woman with breast implants

A mammoplasty procedure for the placement of breast implant devices has three purposes:

1. primary reconstruction: the replacement of breast tissues damaged by trauma (blunt, penetrating, blast), disease (breast cancer), and failed anatomic development (tuberous breast deformity).
2. revision and reconstruction: to revise (correct) the outcome of a previous breast reconstruction surgery.
3. primary augmentation: to aesthetically augment the size, form, and feel of the breasts.

The operating room time of post–mastectomy breast reconstruction, and of breast augmentation surgery is determined by the procedure employed, the type of incisions, the breast implant (type and materials), and the pectoral locale of the implant pocket.

Recent research has indicated that mammograms should not be done with any greater frequency than that used in normal procedure in patients undergoing breast surgery, including breast implant, augmentation, mastopexy, and breast reduction.

=== Psychology ===
The breast augmentation patient usually is a young woman whose personality profile indicates psychological distress about her personal appearance and her bodily self image, and a history of having endured criticism (teasing) about the aesthetics of her person. The studies Body Image Concerns of Breast Augmentation Patients (2003) and Body Dysmorphic Disorder and Cosmetic Surgery (2006) reported that the woman who underwent breast augmentation surgery also had undergone psychotherapy, suffered low self-esteem, presented frequent occurrences of psychological depression, had attempted suicide, and had body dysmorphia, a type of mental illness.

Post-operative patient surveys about mental health and quality-of-life, reported improved physical health, physical appearance, social life, self-confidence, self-esteem, and satisfactory sexual functioning. Furthermore, the women reported long-term satisfaction with their breast implant outcomes; some despite having medical complications that required surgical revision, either corrective or aesthetic. Likewise, in Denmark, 8% of breast augmentation patients had a pre-operative history of psychiatric hospitalization.

In 2008, the longitudinal study Excess Mortality from Suicide and other External Causes of Death Among Women with Cosmetic Breast Implants (2007), reported that women who sought breast implants are almost 3 times as likely to commit suicide as are women who have not sought breast implants. Compared to the standard suicide-rate for women of the general populace, the suicide-rate for women with augmented breasts remained constant until 10-years post-implantation, yet, it increased to 4.5 times greater at the 11-year mark, and so remained until the 19-year mark, when it increased to 6 times greater at 20-years post-implantation. Moreover, additional to the suicide-risk, women with breast implants also faced a trebled death-risk from alcoholism and the abuse of prescription and recreational drugs. Although seven studies have statistically connected a woman's breast augmentation to a greater suicide-rate, the research indicates that breast augmentation surgery does not increase the death rate; and that, in the first instance, it is the psychopathologically-inclined woman who is more likely to undergo a breast augmentation procedure.

The study Effect of Breast Augmentation Mammoplasty on Self-Esteem and Sexuality: A Quantitative Analysis (2007), reported that the women attributed their improved self image, self-esteem, and increased, satisfactory sexual functioning to having undergone breast augmentation; the cohort, aged 21–57 years, averaged post-operative self-esteem increases that ranged from 20.7 to 24.9 points on the 30-point Rosenberg self-esteem scale, which data supported the 78.6 per cent increase in the woman's libido, relative to her pre-operative level of libido. Therefore, before agreeing to any surgery, the plastic surgeon evaluates and considers the woman's mental health to determine if breast implants can positively affect her self-esteem and sexual functioning.

== Complications ==
The plastic surgical emplacement of breast implant devices, either for breast reconstruction or for aesthetic purpose, presents the same health risks common to surgery, such as adverse reaction to anesthesia, hematoma (post-operative bleeding), late hematoma (post-operative bleeding after 6 months or more), seroma (fluid accumulation), incision-site breakdown (wound infection). Complications specific to breast augmentation include breast pain, altered sensation, impeded breast-feeding function, visible wrinkling, asymmetry, thinning of the breast tissue, and symmastia, the "bread loafing" of the bust that interrupts the natural plane between the breasts. Specific treatments for the complications of indwelling breast implants—capsular contracture and capsular rupture—are periodic MRI monitoring and physical examinations. Furthermore, complications and re-operations related to the implantation surgery, and to tissue expanders (implant place-holders during surgery) can cause unfavorable scarring in approximately 6–7 percent of the patients. Statistically, 20 percent of women who underwent cosmetic implantation, and 50 percent of women who underwent breast reconstruction implantation, required their explantation (surgical removal) at the 10-year mark.

=== Safety ===
In the 1990s, several reports reviewed the few studies evaluating any increased risk of systemic and auto-immune diseases among women with breast implants. The conclusion at that time was that there was no evidence establishing a causal connection between the implantation of silicone breast implants and either type of disease. However, the Institute of Medicine report pointed out that these earlier studies included too few women to conclusively evaluate the impact on these rare diseases. In addition, many of the studies included women who had breast implants for just a few months, which would be too early to develop a diagnosed autoimmune disease. In recent years, large epidemiological studies have reported clinically and statistically significant increases in some of these diseases. A study by Watad and colleagues that was published in 2018 compared and examined the medical records of more than 24,000 women with breast implants to more than 98,000 "matched controls" who did not have breast implants but shared very similar demographic traits. The study found a statistically significant 22% overall increase in diagnosed autoimmune or rheumatic disorders. The greatest increases in diagnoses for women with breast implants was for Sjögren's syndrome, Multiple Sclerosis (MS), and sarcoidosis, each of which were 58%-98% higher in women with breast implants. That analysis was based on Israeli women with breast implants as confirmed by medical records, and the analyses of diseases were based on diagnoses made after the women got breast implants that were included in medical records during up to 20 years of follow-up.

A published study of U.S. women with similar results was published in 2019 by Coroneos and his colleagues at MD Anderson Medical Center. The data were based on two studies with a combined total of almost 100,000 women with breast implants, but many dropped out of the study within a few years of their breast implant surgery. However, of the women in the study for at least two years, the researchers reported an 800% increase in Sjögren syndrome, 700% increase in scleroderma, and almost 600% increase in rheumatoid arthritis among women with breast implants compared to the general population of women of the same age and demographics.

Recent research on women who reported autoimmune and other system symptoms but were not diagnosed with an autoimmune disease evaluated whether the women's symptoms changed after their implants were removed. A 2020 study on the effectiveness of explant surgery on women with breast implant illness found that nearly all of 750 women who underwent explant surgery reported a significant improvement in their health within a month after their surgery. Researchers focused on the following symptoms: hair loss, memory loss, dry eyes and/or blurred vision, numbness or tingling in the extremities, chronic fatigue, joint pain, rashes, breast pain, food intolerance, flu-like symptoms, and difficulty breathing. The same authors also published a study on the impact of breast implant removal on breathing difficulties and found a statistically significant improvement in well-established objective measures of pulmonary function following explant surgery.

Year	Country	Systemic Review Group	Conclusions
1991–93	United Kingdom	Independent Expert Advisory Group (IEAG)	There was no evidence of an increased risk of connective-tissue disease in patients who had undergone silicone-gel breast implant emplacement, and no cause for changing either breast implant practice or policy in the U.K.
1996	United States	U.S. Institute of Medicine (IOM)	There was "insufficient evidence for an association of silicone gel- or saline-filled breast implants with defined connective tissue disease."
1996	France	Agence Nationale pour le Developpement de l'Evaluation Medicale (ANDEM) [National Agency for Medical Development and Evaluation]	French original: "Nous n'avons pas observé de connectivité ni d'autre pathologie auto-immune susceptible d'être directement ou indirectement induite par la présence d'un implant mammaire en particulier en gel de silicone...." English translation: "We did not observe connective tissue diseases to be directly or indirectly associated by the presence of a breast implant, in particular one of silicone gel...."
1997	Australia	Therapeutic Devices Evaluation Committee (TDEC)	The "current, high-quality literature suggest that there is no association between breast implants and connective tissue disease-like syndromes (atypical connective tissue diseases)."
1998	Germany	Federal Institute for Medicine and Medical Products	Reported that "silicone breast implants neither cause auto-immune diseases nor rheumatic diseases and have no disadvantageous effects on pregnancy, breast-feeding capability, or the health of children who are breast-fed. There is no scientific evidence for the existence of silicone allergy, silicone poisoning, atypical silicone diseases or a new silicone disease."
2000	United States	Federal court-ordered review	"No evidence of an association between... silicone-gel-filled breast implants specifically, and any of the individual CTDs, all definite CTDs combined, or other auto-immune or rheumatic conditions."
2000	European Union	European Committee on Quality Assurance & Medical Devices in Plastic Surgery (EQUAM)	"Additional medical studies have not demonstrated any association between silicone-gel filled breast implants and traditional auto-immune or connective tissue diseases, cancer, nor any other malignant disease. . . . EQUAM continues to believe that there is no scientific evidence that silicone allergy, silicone intoxication, atypical disease or a 'new silicone disease' exists."
2001	United Kingdom	UK Independent Review Group (UK-IRG)	"There is no evidence of an association with an abnormal immune response or typical or atypical connective tissue diseases or syndromes."
2001	United States	Court-appointed National Science Panel review	The panel evaluated established and undifferentiated connective tissue diseases (CTD), and concluded there was no causal evidence between breast implants and these CTDs.
2003	Spain	Science and Technology Options Assessment (STOA)	The STOA report to the European Parliament Petitions Committee reported that the current scientific evidence demonstrates no solid, causal evidence linking SBI [silicone breast implants] to severe diseases, e.g. breast cancer, connective tissue diseases.
2009	European Union	International Committee for Quality Assurance, Medical Technologies & Devices in Plastic Surgery panel (IQUAM)	The consensus statement of the Transatlantic Innovations conference (April 2009) indicated that additional medical studies demonstrated no association between silicone gel-filled breast implants and carcinoma, or any metabolic, immune, or allergic disorder.

=== Implant rupture ===
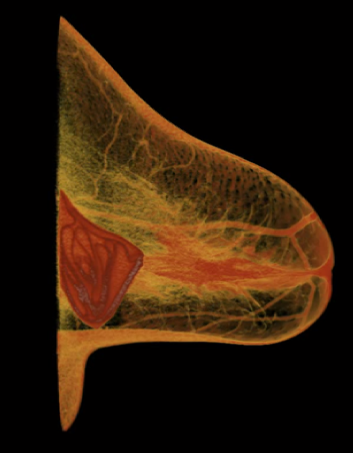
Implant rupture visualized by breast computed tomography

Because a breast implant is a Class III medical device of limited product-life, the principal rupture-rate factors are its age and design; nonetheless, a breast implant device can retain its mechanical integrity for decades in a woman's body. When a saline breast implant ruptures, leaks, and empties, it quickly deflates, and thus can be readily explanted (surgically removed). In some cases, saline implant rupture can result in an infection due to bacteria or mold that had been within the implant, though this is uncommon. The follow-up report, Natrelle Saline-filled Breast Implants: a Prospective 10-year Study (2009) indicated rupture-deflation rates of 3–5 per cent at 3-years post-implantation, and 7–10 per cent rupture-deflation rates at 10-years post-implantation. In a study of his 4761 augmentation mammaplasty patients, Eisenberg reported that overfilling saline breast implants 10-13% significantly reduced the rupture-deflation rate to 1.83% at 8-years post-implantation.

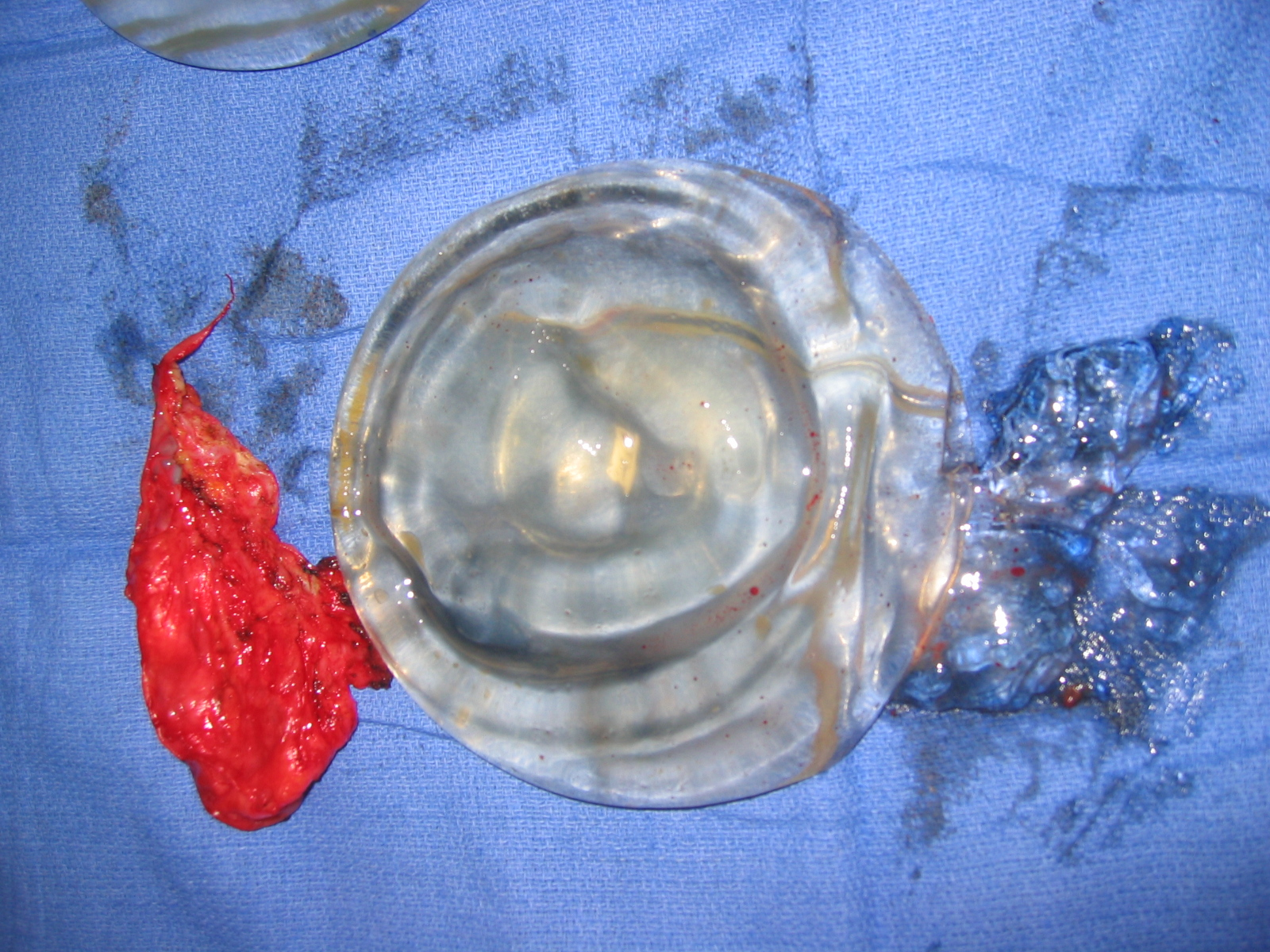
A breast implant failure: the parts of a surgically explanted breast implant are the red, fibrous capsule (left), the ruptured silicone implant (center), and the transparent filler-gel that leaked with the capsule (right).

When a silicone breast implant ruptures it usually does not deflate, yet the filler gel does leak from it, which can migrate to the implant pocket; therefore, an intracapsular rupture (in-capsule leak) can become an extracapsular rupture (out-of-capsule leak), and each occurrence is resolved by explantation. Although the leaked silicone filler-gel can migrate from the chest tissues to elsewhere in the woman's body, most clinical complications are limited to the breast and armpit areas, usually manifested as granulomas (inflammatory nodules) and axillary lymphadenopathy (enlarged lymph glands in the armpit area).

The suspected mechanisms of breast implant rupture are:

- damage during implantation
- damage during (other) surgical procedures
- chemical degradation of the breast implant shell
- trauma (blunt trauma, penetrating trauma, blast trauma)
- mechanical pressure of traditional mammographic breast examination

Silicone implant rupture can be evaluated using magnetic resonance imaging; from the long-term MRI data for single-lumen breast implants, the European literature about second generation silicone-gel breast implants (1970s design), reported silent device-rupture rates of 8–15 per cent at 10-years post-implantation (15–30% of the patients). Additionally, high-resolution ultrasound is another effective method of evaluating silicone implant integrity.

The study Safety and Effectiveness of Mentor's MemoryGel Implants at 6 Years (2009), which was a branch study of the U.S. FDA's core clinical trials for primary breast augmentation surgery patients, reported low device-rupture rates of 1.1 per cent at 6-years post-implantation. The first series of MRI evaluations of the silicone breast implants with thick filler-gel reported a device-rupture rate of 1 percent, or less, at the median 6-year device-age. Statistically, the manual examination (palpation) of the woman is inadequate for accurately evaluating if a breast implant has ruptured. The study, The Diagnosis of Silicone Breast implant Rupture: Clinical Findings Compared with Findings at Magnetic Resonance Imaging (2005), reported that, in asymptomatic patients, only 30 per cent of the ruptured breast implants are accurately palpated and detected by an experienced plastic surgeon, whereas MRI examinations accurately detected 86 per cent of breast implant ruptures. Therefore, the U.S. FDA recommended scheduled MRI examinations, as silent-rupture screenings, beginning at the 3-year-mark post-implantation, and then every two years, thereafter. Nonetheless, beyond the U.S., the medical establishments of other nations have not endorsed routine MRI screening, and, in its stead, proposed that such a radiologic examination be reserved for two purposes: (i) for the woman with a suspected breast implant rupture; and (ii) for the confirmation of mammographic and ultrasonic studies that indicate the presence of a ruptured breast implant.

Furthermore, The Effect of Study design Biases on the Diagnostic Accuracy of Magnetic Resonance Imaging for Detecting Silicone Breast Implant Ruptures: a Meta-analysis (2011) reported that the breast-screening MRIs of asymptomatic women might overestimate the incidence of breast implant rupture. In the event, the U.S. Food and Drug Administration emphasised that "breast implants are not lifetime devices. The longer a woman has silicone gel-filled breast implants, the more likely she is to experience complications."

=== Capsular contracture ===
The human body's immune response to a surgically installed foreign object—breast implant, cardiac pacemaker, orthopedic prosthesis—is to encapsulate it with scar tissue capsules of tightly woven collagen fibers, in order to maintain the integrity of the body by isolating the foreign object, and so tolerate its presence. Capsular contracture—which should be distinguished from normal capsular tissue—occurs when the collagen-fiber capsule thickens and compresses the breast implant; it is a painful complication that might distort either the breast implant, or the breast, or both. Capsular contracture is diagnosed through a visual and physical examiniation according to level of increasing severity based on the Baker Grade scale: Baker Grade I, Baker Grade II, Baker Grade III, and Baker Grade IV. Superior implant malposition may also produce breast distortion without pathologic capsular contracture. In a 2026 retrospective series of 209 surgically corrected high-riding saline implants, all had macroscopically normal fibrous capsules, suggesting a mechanical rather than inflammatory mechanism in this cohort.

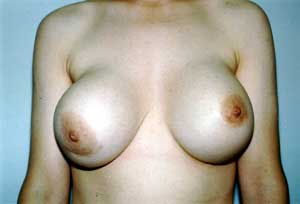
A breast implant failure: capsular contracture is a medical complication, in this case, a Baker scale Grade IV contraction, of a subglandular silicone implant in the right breast.

The cause of capsular contracture is unknown, but the common incidence factors include bacterial contamination, device-shell rupture, filler leakage, and hematoma. The surgical implantation procedures that have reduced the incidence of capsular contracture include submuscular emplacement, the use of breast implants with a textured surface (polyurethane-coated); limited pre-operative handling of the implants, limited contact with the chest skin of the implant pocket before the emplacement of the breast implant, and irrigation of the recipient site with triple-antibiotic solutions.

The correction of capsular contracture might require an open capsulotomy (surgical release) of the collagen-fiber capsule, or the removal, and possible replacement, of the breast implant. Furthermore, in treating capsular contracture, the closed capsulotomy (disruption via external manipulation) once was a common maneuver for treating hard capsules, but now is a discouraged technique, because it can rupture the breast implant. Non-surgical treatments for collagen-fiber capsules include massage, external ultrasonic therapy, leukotriene pathway inhibitors such as zafirlukast (Accolate) or montelukast (Singulair), and pulsed electromagnetic field therapy (PEMFT).

=== Repair and revision surgeries ===
When the patient is unsatisfied with the outcome of the augmentation mammoplasty; or when technical or medical complications occur; or because of the breast implants' limited product life, it is likely she might require replacing the breast implants or request explantation. Common revision surgery indications include major and minor medical complications, capsular contracture, shell rupture, and device deflation. Reasons for request for explantation may include implant safety concerns as well as significant weight gain exceeding 10% of body weight and/or multiple prior surgeries. Revision incidence rates were greater for breast reconstruction patients, because of the post-mastectomy changes to the soft-tissues and to the skin envelope of the breast, and to the anatomical borders of the breast, especially in women who received adjuvant external radiation therapy. Moreover, besides breast reconstruction, breast cancer patients usually undergo revision surgery of the nipple-areola complex (NAC), and symmetry procedures upon the opposite breast, to create a bust of natural appearance, size, form, and feel. Carefully matching the type and size of the breast implants to the patient's pectoral soft-tissue characteristics reduces the incidence of revision surgery. Appropriate tissue matching, implant selection, and proper implantation technique, the re-operation rate was 3 percent at the 7-year-mark, compared with the re-operation rate of 20 per cent at the 3-year-mark, as reported by the U.S. Food and Drug Administration.

=== Systemic disease ===
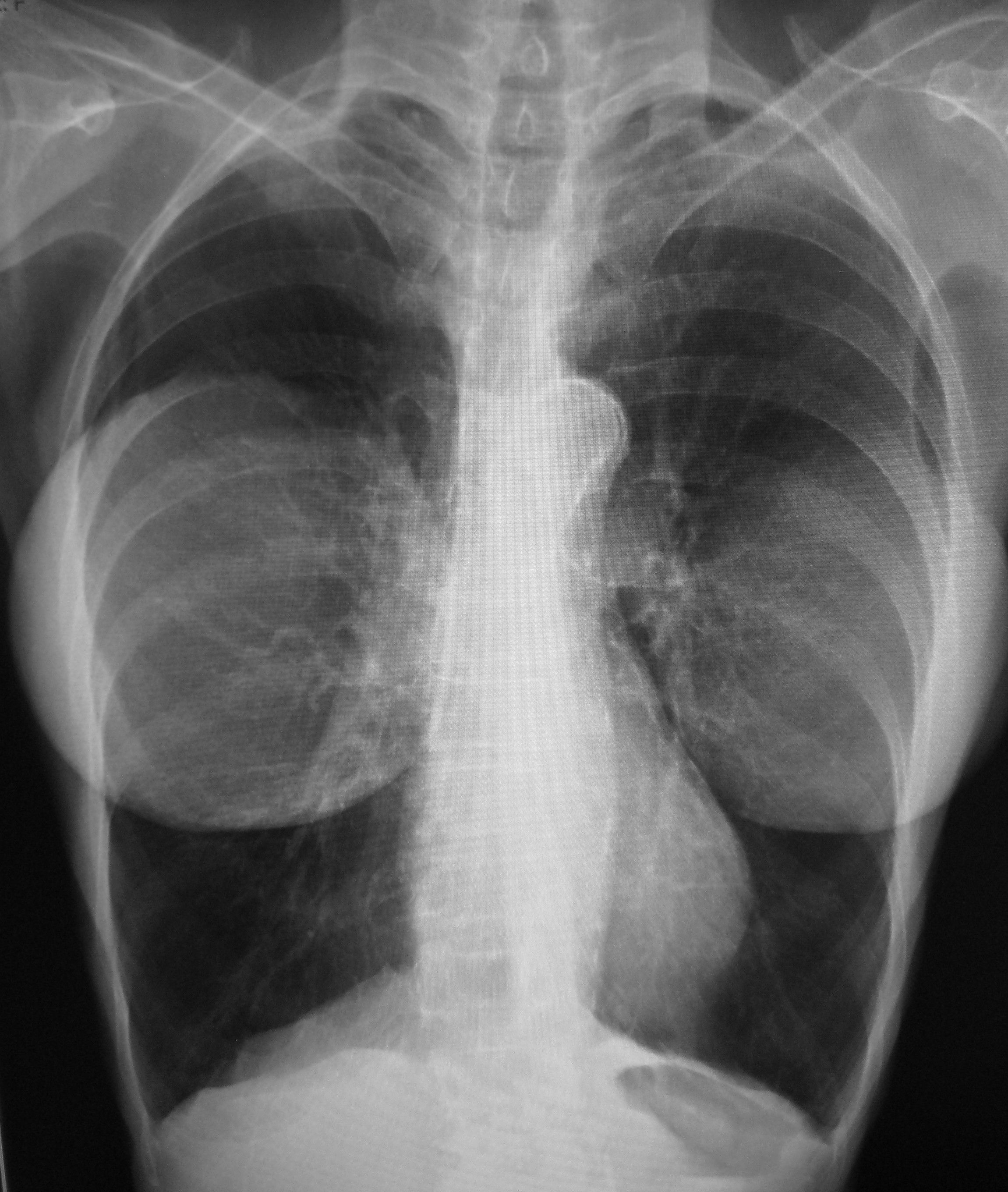
Chest X-ray showing breast implants

In the 1990s, the national health ministries of the listed countries reviewed the pertinent studies for causal links among silicone-gel breast implants and systemic and diagnosed autoimmune diseases and breast cancer. A study by researchers at the U.S. National Institute of Health reported an increase in four types of cancer among women with breast implants compared to other plastic surgery patients of the same age and similar demographic traits and health habits. This increase in cancer was attenuated but did not disappear when the researchers followed the women for 5 more years, with a 43% increase in brain cancer and a 63% increase in respiratory cancer compared to other plastic surgery patients. A study by Watad et al. evaluated the medical records of more than 24,000 women with breast implants compared to more than 98,000 women with the same demographic traits who did not have breast implants. The researchers found a statistically significant 22 percent increase in several diagnosed diseases, increasing to more than 60% for Sjogren's syndrome, multiple sclerosis, and sarcoidosis After investigating this issue, in 2021 the U.S. FDA revised its "black box warnings" on breast implants to acknowledge the association between breast implants and systemic autoimmune, rheumatologic, and neurological symptoms to state: "Patients receiving breast implants have reported a variety of systemic symptoms, such as joint pain, muscle aches, confusion, chronic fatigue, autoimmune diseases, and others. Individual patient risk for developing these symptoms has not been well established. Some patients report complete resolution of symptoms when the implants are removed without replacement".

A 2021 study by Cleveland Clinic physicians investigated the outcome of breast implant removal on women with breast implants who had reported difficulty breathing or tightness in their chest; this is one of the symptoms associated with breast implant illness. The study examined breast implant patients who reported problems breathing, comparing their scores on 6 pulmonary function tests before and after their implants and scar capsules were removed. The researchers reported that 74% of the patients reported significant improvements on at least 3 of the pulmonary function tests. In self-reports, all study participants reported that their breathing improved after their implant surgery.

=== Platinum toxicity ===
Platinum is a catalyst used in the making of silicone implant polymer shells and other silicone devices used in medicine. The literature indicates that small amounts of platinum leaches (leaks) from these implants and is present in the surrounding tissue. The FDA reviewed the available studies from the medical literature on platinum and breast implants in 2002 and concluded there was little evidence suggesting toxicity from platinum in implant patients. The FDA revisited this study and additional literature several years later, reaffirming prior conclusions that platinum catalysts used in implants is likely not ionized and therefore would not represent a risk to women.

=== Anaplastic large-cell lymphoma ===
The FDA has identified that breast implants may be associated with a rare form of cancer called anaplastic large-cell lymphoma (ALCL), which some experts believe is believed to be associated with chronic bacterial inflammation. Similar ALCL phenomena have been seen with other types of medical implants including vascular access ports, orthopedic hip implants, and jaw (TMJ) implants. The causal association between breast implants and ALCL was conclusively established in December 2013, when researchers at MD Anderson Cancer Center published a study of 60 women with breast implants who were diagnosed with ALCL in the breast. In 2015, plastic surgeons published an article reviewing 37 articles in the literature on 79 patients and collected another 94 unreported cases, resulting in 173 women with breast implants who had developed ALCL of the breast. They concluded that "Breast implant-associated ALCL is a novel manifestation of site- and material-specific lymphoma originating in a specific scar location, presenting a wide array of diverse characteristics and suggesting a multifactorial cause." They stated that "There was no preference for saline or silicone fill or for cosmetic or reconstructive indications." Where implant history was known, the patient had received at least one textured-surface device. In 2016, the World Health Organization (WHO) officially recognized BIA-ALCL.

As of April 2022, the FDA has received 1,130 global medical device reports (MDRs) of BIA-ALCL, including 59 deaths. Since ALCL was thought to be diagnosed in only 1 woman in half a million, 60 women was a much higher number than would be expected. The researchers pointed out that BIA-ALCL could be fatal. If women with implants present with delayed swelling or fluid collection, cytologic studies and a test for the marker CD30 are suggested. The American Society of Plastic Surgery (ASPS) states, "CD30 is the main diagnostic test that must be performed on the seroma fluid as routine pathology or H&E staining can frequently miss the diagnosis." Diagnosis and treatment of breast implant-associated ALCL now follows standardized guidelines established by the National Comprehensive Cancer Network.

The current lifetime risk of BIA-ALCL in the U.S. is unknown, but estimates have ranged between one in 70,000 and one in 500,000 women with breast implants, according to the MD Anderson Cancer Center. Countries with breast implant registries have the best data on the risks of BIA-ALCL. For example, as of October 2020, the Therapeutic Goods Administration of Australia and New Zealand reported a "1:3,345 risk with Allergan Biocell and a 1:86,029 risk with Mentor Siltex." AIn the U.S., estimates of the risk of BIA-ALCL in textured implants ranges from 1.79 per 1,000 (1 woman with BIA-ALCL per 559 implants) to 2.82 per 1,000 (1 woman per 355 implants)[2]. As of April 2022, the FDA reported 1,130 medical device reports (MDRs) of BIA-ALCL. Of those MDRs, 59 of the women died. FDA states that 798 of the 1,130 MDRs for BIA-ALCL involved textured breast implants, 37 MDRs involved smooth-surfaced implants, and 295 MDRs did not specify whether the implants were textured or smooth. In some cases, the women who developed BIA-ALCL after smooth breast implants had textured expanders prior to their implants. Most patients had BIA-ALCL affect only one breast with only 8 patients diagnosed with bilateral BIA-ALCL. The most common reported symptom of BIA-ALCL according to the FDA was seroma, followed by breast swelling and pain, capsular contracture, and peri-implant mass or lump. Furthermore, 84 percent of the reported implants were made by Allergan, the largest breast implant manufacturer at the time.

A study conducted at Memorial Sloan Kettering cancer center of women undergoing prophylactic mastectomies indicated that 1 in 355 women were subsequently diagnosed with BIA-ALCL. Almost all those women had Allergan biocell implants and expanders. These reports strongly suggest that BIA-ALCL develops primarily in patients with textured implants or expanders. In all cases, however, many researchers suspect that BIA-ALCL is an under-recognized, misdiagnosed, and under-reported complication of breast implants.

The ASPS and the Plastic Surgery Foundation (PSF) have partnered with the FDA to study this condition and in doing so created the Patient Registry and Outcomes for Breast Implants and Anaplastic Large Cell Lymphoma Etiology and Epidemiology (PROFILE). The United States FDA strongly encourages all physicians to report cases to PROFILE in an effort to better understand the role of breast implants in ALCL and the management of this disease.

=== Other lymphomas and squamous-cell carcinoma ===
In September 2022, the FDA announced new information regarding other types of cancers related to breast implants, based on medical device reports (MDRs) of cases of patients with squamous-cell carcinoma or various lymphomas found in the scar tissue around breast implants. The agency reported 10 MDRs about squamous-sell carcinoma found in the capsule scar tissue and 12 MDRs about various lymphomas also in the scar tissue around the breast implants. These new cases do not overlap with cases of BIA-ALCL. SCC and other lymphomas have been found in smooth-surface and textured implants as well as silicone-gel-filled and saline-filled implants. Patients who reported symptoms specified swelling, pain, lumps, and changes to their skin. As of 2022, neither the incidence rate nor prevalence is known.

== Surgical procedures ==
=== Incision types ===
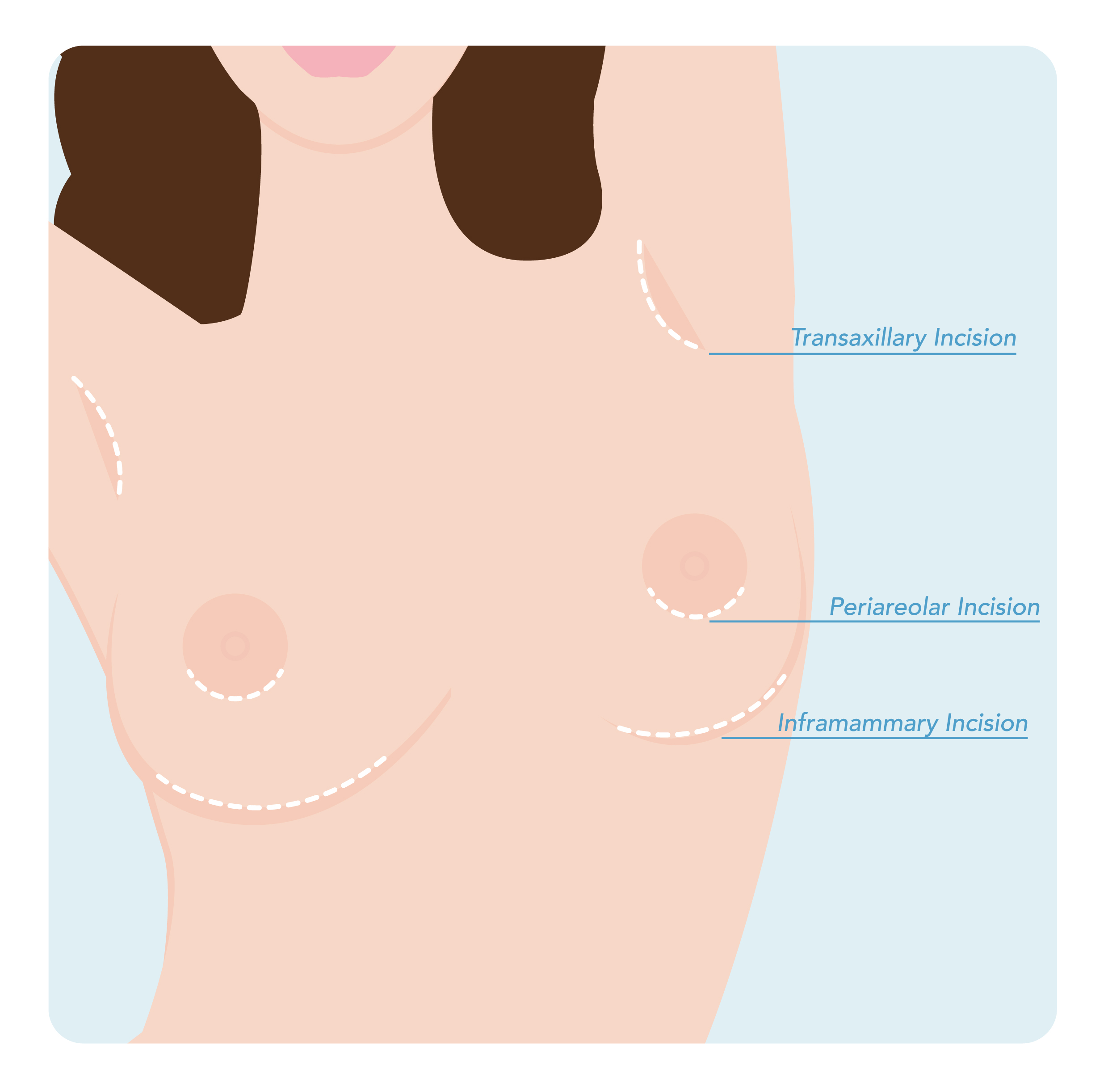
Common incision locations for implants

Breast implant emplacement is performed with five types of surgical incisions:

1. Inframammary: an incision made to the inframammary fold (natural crease under the breast), which affords maximal access for precise dissection of the tissues and emplacement of the breast implants. It is the preferred surgical technique for emplacing silicone-gel implants, because it better exposes the breast tissue–pectoralis muscle interface; yet, IMF implantation can produce thicker, slightly more visible surgical scars.
2. Periareolar: a border-line incision along the periphery of the areola, which provides an optimal approach when adjustments to the IMF position are required, or when a mastopexy (breast lift) is included to the primary mammoplasty procedure. In periareolar emplacement, the incision is around the medial-half (inferior half) of the areola's circumference. Silicone gel implants can be difficult to emplace via periareolar incision, because of the short, five-centimetre length (~ 5.0 cm) of the required access-incision. Aesthetically, because the scars are at the areola's border (periphery), they usually are less visible than the IMF-incision scars of women with light-pigment areolae; when compared to cutaneous-incision scars, the modified epithelia of the areolae are less prone to (raised) hypertrophic scars.
3. Transaxillary: an incision made to the axilla (armpit), from which the dissection tunnels medially, to emplace the implants, either bluntly or with an endoscope (illuminated video microcamera), without producing visible scars on the breast proper; yet, it is likelier to produce inferior asymmetry of the implant-device position. Therefore, surgical revision of transaxillary emplaced breast implants usually requires either an IMF incision or a periareolar incision.
4. Transumbilical: a trans-umbilical breast augmentation (TUBA) is a less common implant-device emplacement technique wherein the incision is at the umbilicus (navel), and the dissection tunnels superiorly, up towards the bust. The TUBA approach allows emplacing the breast implants without producing visible scars upon the breast proper; but makes appropriate dissection and device-emplacement more technically difficult. A TUBA procedure is performed bluntly—without the endoscope's visual assistance—and is not appropriate for emplacing (pre-filled) silicone-gel implants, because of the great potential for damaging the elastomer silicone shell of the breast implant during its manual insertion through the short (~2.0 cm) incision at the navel, and because pre-filled silicone gel implants are incompressible, and cannot be inserted through so small an incision.
5. Transabdominal: as in the TUBA procedure, in the transabdominoplasty breast augmentation (TABA), the breast implants are tunneled superiorly from the abdominal incision into bluntly dissected implant pockets, whilst the patient simultaneously undergoes an abdominoplasty.

=== Implant pocket placement ===
Implant placement comparison

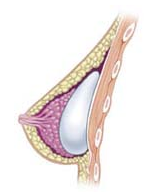
Subglandular implant

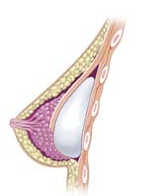
Subpectoral implant

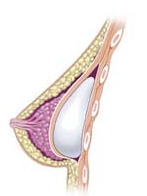
Submuscular implant

The five surgical approaches to emplacing a breast implant to the implant pocket are often described in anatomical relation to the pectoralis major muscle.

1. Subglandular: the breast implant is emplaced to the retromammary space, between the breast tissue (the mammary gland) and the pectoralis major muscle (major muscle of the chest), which most approximates the plane of normal breast tissue, and affords the most aesthetic results. Yet, in women with thin pectoral soft-tissue, the subglandular position is likelier to show the ripples and wrinkles of the underlying implant. Moreover, the capsular contracture incidence rate is slightly greater with subglandular implantation.
2. Subfascial: the breast implant is emplaced beneath the fascia of the pectoralis major muscle; the subfascial position is a variant of the subglandular position for the breast implant. The technical advantages of the subfascial implant-pocket technique are debated; proponent surgeons report that the layer of fascial tissue provides greater implant coverage and better sustains its position.
3. Subpectoral (dual plane): the breast implant is emplaced beneath the pectoralis major muscle, after the surgeon releases the inferior muscular attachments, with or without partial dissection of the subglandular plane. Resultantly, the upper pole of the implant is partially beneath the pectoralis major muscle, while the lower pole of the implant is in the subglandular plane. This implantation technique achieves maximal coverage of the upper pole of the implant, whilst allowing the expansion of the implant's lower pole; however, "animation deformity", the movement of the implants in the subpectoral plane can be excessive for some patients.
4. Submuscular: the breast implant is emplaced beneath the pectoralis major muscle, without releasing the inferior origin of the muscle proper. Total muscular coverage of the implant can be achieved by releasing the lateral muscles of the chest wall—either the serratus muscle or the pectoralis minor muscle, or both—and suturing it, or them, to the pectoralis major muscle. In breast reconstruction surgery, the submuscular implantation approach effects maximal coverage of the breast implants. This technique is rarely used in cosmetic surgery due to high risk of animation deformities.
5. Prepectoral or subcutaneous: in a breast reconstruction following a skin-sparing or skin- and nipple-sparing mastectomy, the implant is placed above the pectoralis major muscle without dissecting it so that the implant fills directly the volume of the mammary gland that has been removed. To avoid the issue of capsular contracture, the implant is often covered frontally or completely with a mesh in biomaterial, either biological or synthetic.

=== Post-surgical recovery ===
The surgical scars of a breast augmentation mammoplasty develop approximately at 6-weeks post-operative, and fade within months. Depending upon the daily-life physical activities required of the woman, the breast augmentation patient usually resumes her normal life at 1-week post-operative. Moreover, women whose breast implants were emplaced beneath the chest muscles (submuscular placement) usually have a longer, slightly more painful convalescence, because of the healing of the incisions to the chest muscles. Usually, she does not exercise or engage in strenuous physical activities for approximately 6 weeks. During the initial post-operative recovery, the woman is encouraged to regularly exercise (flex and move) her arm to alleviate pain and discomfort; if required, analgesic indwelling medication catheters can alleviate pain Moreover, significantly improved patient recovery has resulted from refined breast-device implantation techniques (submuscular, subglandular) that allow 95 per cent of women to resume their normal lives at 24-hours post-procedure, without bandages, fluid drains, pain pumps, catheters, medical support brassières, or narcotic pain medication.

=== Types ===
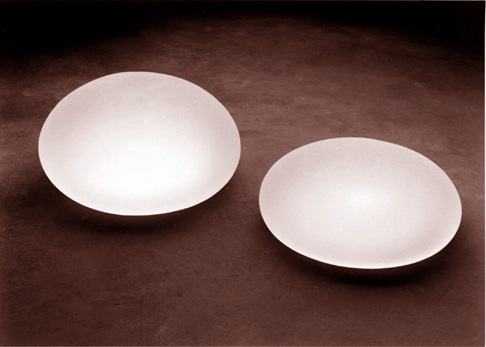
Saline-solution-filled breast implant device models

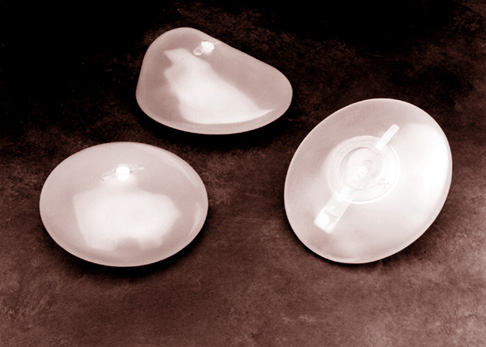
Late-generation models of silicone gel-filled prostheses

Today, there are three types of breast implants commonly used for mammaplasty, breast reconstruction, and breast augmentation procedures:

1. saline implant filled with sterile saline solution.
2. silicone implant filled with viscous silicone gel.
3. structured implants using nested elastomer silicone shells and two saline filled lumen.

A fourth type of implant, composite (or alternative-composite) implants, have largely been discontinued. These types featured fillers such as soy oil and polypropylene string. Other discontinued materials include ox cartilage, Terylene wool, ground rubber, silastic rubber, and teflon-silicone prostheses.

==== Saline implants ====
The saline breast implant—filled with saline solution (biological-concentration salt water 0.90% w/v of NaCl, ca. 300 mOsm/L.)—was first manufactured by the Laboratoires Arion company, in France, and was introduced for use as a prosthetic medical device in 1964. The contemporary models of saline breast implant are manufactured with thicker, room-temperature vulcanized (RTV) shells made of a silicone elastomer. The study In vitro Deflation of Pre-filled Saline Breast Implants (2006) reported that the rates of deflation (filler leakage) of the pre-filled saline breast implant made it a second-choice prosthesis for corrective breast surgery. Nonetheless, in the 1990s, the saline breast implant was the prosthesis most common device used for breast augmentation surgery in the United States, because of the U.S. FDA's restriction against the implantation of silicone-filled breast implants outside of clinical studies. Saline breast implants have enjoyed little popularity in the rest of the world, possessing negligible market share.

The technical goal of saline-implant technology was a physically less invasive surgical technique for emplacing an empty breast implant device through a smaller surgical incision. In surgical praxis, after having emplaced the empty breast implants to the implant pockets, the plastic surgeon then filled each device with saline solution, and, because the required insertion-incisions are short and small, the resultant incision-scars will be smaller and shorter than the surgical scars usual to the long incisions required for inserting pre-filled, silicone-gel implants.

When compared to the results achieved with a silicone-gel breast implant, the saline implant can yield acceptable results, of increased breast-size, smoother hemisphere-contour, and realistic texture; yet, it is likelier to cause cosmetic problems, such as the rippling and the wrinkling of the breast-envelope skin, accelerated lower breast pole stretch, and technical problems, such as the presence of the implant being noticeable to the eye and to the touch. The occurrence of such cosmetic problems is likelier in the case of the woman with very little breast tissue, and in the case of the woman who requires post-mastectomy breast reconstruction; thus, the silicone-gel implant is the technically superior prosthetic device for breast augmentation, and for breast reconstruction. In the case of the woman with much breast tissue, for whom sub-muscular emplacement is the recommended surgical approach, saline breast implants can produce an aesthetic result much like that afforded by silicone breast implants. Ultrasound examination and outcome studies have revealed that saline and silicone breast implants look and feel similar.

==== Silicone gel implants ====
As a medical device technology, there are six generations of silicone breast implant, each defined by common model-manufacturing techniques.

The modern prosthetic breast was invented in 1961 by the American plastic surgeons Thomas Cronin and Frank Gerow, and manufactured by the Dow Corning Corporation; in due course, the first augmentation mammoplasty was performed in 1962.

===== First generation =====
The Cronin–Gerow Implant, prosthesis model 1963, was a silicone rubber envelope-sac, shaped like a teardrop, which was filled with viscous silicone-gel. To reduce the rotation of the emplaced breast implant upon the chest wall, the model 1963 prosthesis was affixed to the implant pocket with a fastener-patch, made of Dacron material (polyethylene terephthalate), which was attached to the rear of the breast implant shell.

===== Second generation =====
In the 1970s, manufacturers presented the second generation of breast implant prostheses that featured functional developments and aesthetic improvements to the technology:

- the first technological developments were a thinner-gauge device-shell, and a filler gel of low-cohesion silicone, which improved the functionality and the verisimilitude (size, appearance, and texture) of the silicone-gel breast implant. Yet, in clinical practice, second-generation breast implants proved fragile and saw greater instances of shell rupture, and of filler leakage ("silicone-gel bleed") through the intact device shell. The consequent, increased incidence-rates of medical complications (e.g. capsular contracture) precipitated faulty-product, class action-lawsuits, by the U.S. government, against the Dow Corning Corporation, and other manufacturers of breast prostheses.
- the second technological development was a polyurethane foam coating for the shell of the breast implant; the coating reduced the incidence of capsular contracture, by causing an inflammatory reaction that impeded the formation of a capsule of fibrous collagen tissue around the breast implant. Nevertheless, despite that prophylactic measure, the medical use of polyurethane-coated breast implants was briefly discontinued, because of the potential health-risk posed by 2,4-toluenediamine (TDA), a carcinogenic by-product of the chemical breakdown of the polyurethane foam coating of the breast implant proven to cause liver and skin cancers in animal-model studies.

After reviewing the medical data, the U.S. Food and Drug Administration concluded that TDA-induced breast cancer was an infinitesimal health-risk to women with breast implants, and did not justify legally requiring physicians to explain the matter to their patients. In the event, polyurethane-coated breast implants remain in plastic surgery practice in Europe and in South America; and no manufacturer has sought FDA approval for medical sales of such breast implants in the U.S.

- the third technological development was the double lumen breast implant device, a double-cavity prosthesis composed of a silicone breast implant contained within a saline breast implant. The two-fold, technical goal was: (i) the cosmetic benefits of silicone-gel (the inner lumen) enclosed in saline solution (the outer lumen); (ii) a breast implant device the volume of which is post-operatively adjustable. Nevertheless, the more complex design of the double-lumen breast implant suffered a device-failure rate greater than that of single-lumen breast implants. The contemporary versions of second-generation breast implant devices (presented in 1984) are the "Becker Expandable" models of breast implant, which are primarily used for breast reconstruction.

===== Third and fourth generations =====
In the 1980s, the models of the third and of the fourth generations of breast implant devices were sequential advances in manufacturing technology, such as elastomer-coated shells that decreased gel-bleed (filler leakage), and a thicker (increased-cohesion) filler gel. Sociologically, the manufacturers of prosthetic breasts then designed and made anatomic models (natural breast) and shaped models (round, tapered) that realistically corresponded with the breast- and body- types of women. The tapered models of breast implant have a uniformly textured surface, which reduces the rotation of the prosthesis within the implant pocket; the round models of breast implant are available in smooth-surface- and textured-surface- types.

===== Fifth generation =====
Since the mid-1990s, the fifth generation of silicone-gel breast implant is made of a high-strength, highly cohesive silicone gel that mostly eliminates the occurrences of filler leakage ("silicone gel bleed") and of the migration of the silicone filler from the implant pocket to elsewhere in the woman's body. These implants are commonly referred to as "gummy bear breast implants" for their firm, pliant consistency, which is similar to gummy candies. The studies Experience with Anatomical Soft Cohesive Silicone gel Prosthesis in Cosmetic and Reconstructive Breast Implant Surgery (2004) and Cohesive Silicone gel Breast Implants in Aesthetic and Reconstructive Breast Surgery (2005) reported low incidence-rates of capsular contracture and of device-shell rupture; and greater rates of improved medical-safety and technical-efficacy than that of early generation breast implant devices.

===== Sixth generation =====
Sixth generation breast implants were introduced in the early 2010s to address some of the issues seen in previous generations. They feature a smoother surface that is designed to minimize the body's inflammatory response and reduce the risk of a foreign body reaction. These implants use a newer, biomimetic topography that helps to reduce bacterial growth and inflammation compared to the earlier macro-textured devices. Additionally, they incorporate other advancements, such as ergonomic gels that change shape depending on body position and advanced multi-layered shells to reduce the diffusion of silicone. Some manufacturers have also introduced lightweight alternatives that use hollow microspheres mixed with silicone gel to make the implants lighter for a given volume. This has led to improved results, with studies showing that the implants form thinner capsules and cause less inflammation than their predecessors.

== Breastfeeding ==
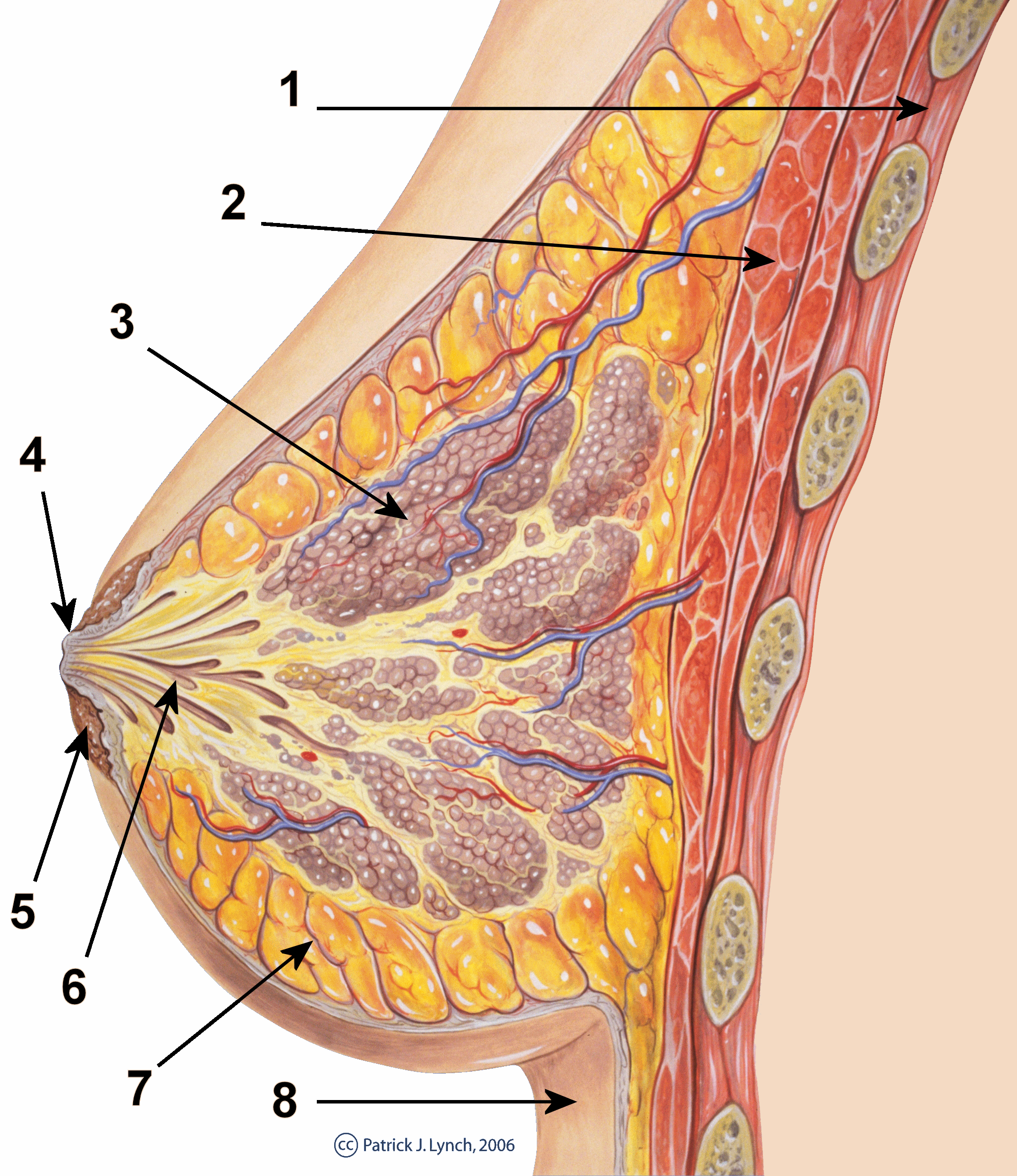
Cross-section scheme of the mammary gland: 1. Chest wall; 2. Pectoralis muscles; 3. Lobules; 4. Nipple; 5. Areola; 6. Milk duct; 7. Fatty tissue; 8. Skin envelope

The presence of breast implants currently presents no contraindication to breast feeding, and there is no evidence to support that the practice may present health issues to a breastfeeding infant.

Women with breast implants may have functional breast-feeding difficulties; mammoplasty procedures that feature periareolar incisions are especially likely to cause breastfeeding difficulties. Surgery may also damage the lactiferous ducts and the nerves in the nipple-areola area.

Functional breastfeeding difficulties arise if the surgeon cut the milk ducts or the major nerves innervating the breast, or if the milk glands were otherwise damaged. Milk duct and nerve damage are more common if the incisions cut tissue near the nipple. The milk glands are most likely to be affected by subglandular implants and by large-sized breast implants, which pinch the lactiferous ducts and impede milk flow. Small-sized breast implants and submuscular implantation cause fewer breast-function problems; however, it is impossible to predict whether a woman who undergoes breast augmentation will be able to successfully breast feed since some women are able to breast-feed after periareolar incisions and subglandular placement and some are not able to after augmentation using submuscular and other types of surgical incisions.

== Mammography ==
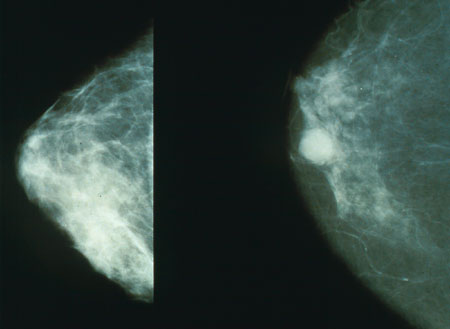
A mammograph of a normal breast (left); a mammograph of a cancerous breast (right)

The presence of radiologically opaque breast implants (either saline or silicone) might interfere with the radiographic sensitivity of the mammograph, that is, the image might not show any tumor(s) present. In this case, an Eklund view mammogram is required to ascertain either the presence or the absence of a cancerous tumor, wherein the breast implant is manually displaced against the chest wall and the breast is pulled forward, so that the mammograph can visualize a greater volume of the internal tissues; nonetheless, approximately one-third of the breast tissue remains inadequately visualized, resulting in an increased incidence of mammograms with false-negative results.

The breast cancer studies Cancer in the Augmented Breast: Diagnosis and Prognosis (1993) and Breast Cancer after Augmentation Mammoplasty (2001) of women with breast implant prostheses reported no significant differences in disease-stage at the time of the diagnosis of cancer; prognoses are similar in both groups of women, with augmented patients at a lower risk for subsequent cancer recurrence or death. Conversely, the use of implants for breast reconstruction after breast cancer mastectomy appears to have no negative effect upon the incidence of cancer-related death. That patients with breast implants are more often diagnosed with palpable—but not larger—tumors indicates that equal-sized tumors might be more readily palpated in augmented patients, which might compensate for the impaired mammogram images. The ready palpability of the breast-cancer tumor(s) is consequent to breast tissue thinning by compression, innately in smaller breasts a priori (because they have lesser tissue volumes), and that the implant serves as a radio-opaque base against which a cancerous tumor can be differentiated.

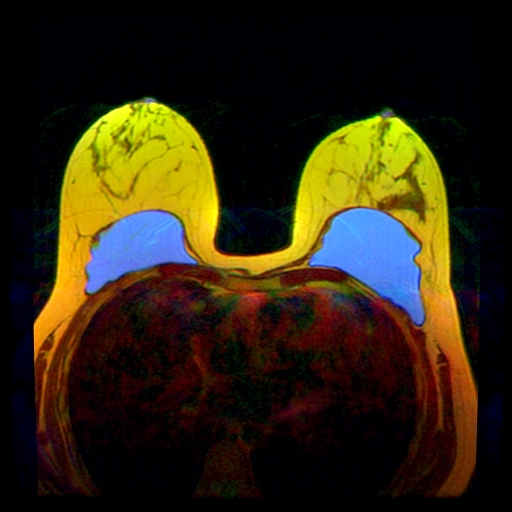
Breast MRI of a patient with implant (blue)

The breast implant has no clinical bearing upon lumpectomy breast-conservation surgery for women who developed breast cancer after the implantation procedure, nor does the breast implant interfere with external beam radiation treatments (XRT); moreover, the post-treatment incidence of breast-tissue fibrosis is common, and thus a consequent increased rate of capsular contracture. There is tentative evidence that women who have had breast augmentation, have worse breast cancer prognosis. The use of implants for breast reconstruction after breast cancer mastectomy appears to have no negative effect upon cancer-related death.

There have been multiple reported cases of other adverse effects of mammography of women with breast implants; ruptures resulting from pressure exerted on the breast implant make up a majority of these cases. Compression may also lead to pain or exacerbate already existing pain in the breasts.

== History ==
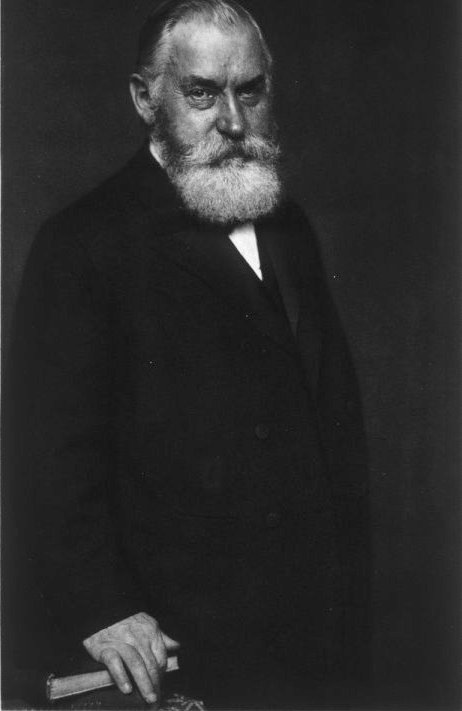
Vincenz Czerny (1842–1916), a pioneer in breast reconstruction

=== 19th century ===
Since the late nineteenth century, breast implants have been used to surgically augment the size (volume), modify the shape (contour), and enhance the feel (tact) of a woman's breasts. In 1895, surgeon Vincenz Czerny effected the earliest breast implant emplacement when he used the patient's autologous adipose tissue, harvested from a benign lumbar lipoma, to repair the asymmetry of the breast from which he had removed a tumor. In 1889, surgeon Robert Gersuny experimented with paraffin injections, with disastrous results arising from the breakup of the paraffin into smaller bodies following the procedure.

=== 20th century ===
From the first half of the twentieth century, physicians used other substances as breast implant fillers—ivory, glass balls, ground rubber, ox cartilage, Terylene wool, gutta-percha, Dicora, polyethylene chips, Ivalon (polyvinyl alcohol—formaldehyde polymer sponge), a polyethylene sac with Ivalon, polyether foam sponge (Etheron), polyethylene tape (Polystan) strips wound into a ball, polyester (polyurethane foam sponge) Silastic rubber, and teflon-silicone prostheses.

In the mid-twentieth century, Morton I. Berson, in 1945, and Jacques Maliniac, in 1950, each performed flap-based breast augmentations by rotating the patient's chest wall tissue into the breast to increase its volume. Furthermore, throughout the 1950s and the 1960s, plastic surgeons used synthetic fillers—including silicone injections received by some 50,000 women, from which developed silicone granulomas and breast hardening that required treatment by mastectomy. In 1961, the American plastic surgeons Thomas Cronin and Frank Gerow, and the Dow Corning Corporation, developed the first silicone breast prosthesis, filled with silicone gel; in due course, the first augmentation mammoplasty was performed in 1962 using the Cronin–Gerow Implant, prosthesis model 1963. In 1964, the French company Laboratoires Arion developed and manufactured the saline breast implant, filled with saline solution, and then introduced for use as a medical device in 1964.

=== FDA approval ===
In 1988, twenty-six years after the 1962 introduction of breast implants filled with silicone gel, the U.S. Food and Drug Administration (FDA) investigated breast implant failures and the subsequent complications, and re-classified breast implant devices as Class III medical devices, and required from manufacturers the documentary data substantiating the safety and efficacy of their breast implant devices. In 1992, the FDA placed silicone-gel breast implants in moratorium in the U.S., because there was "inadequate information to demonstrate that breast implants were safe and effective". Nonetheless, medical access to silicone-gel breast implant devices continued for clinical studies of post-mastectomy breast reconstruction, the correction of congenital deformities, and the replacement of ruptured silicone-gel implants. The FDA required from the manufacturers the clinical trial data, and permitted their providing breast implants to the breast augmentation patients for the statistical studies required by the U.S. Food and Drug Administration. In mid-1992, the FDA approved an adjunct study protocol for silicone-gel filled implants for breast reconstruction patients, and for revision-surgery patients. Also in 1992, the Dow Corning Corporation, a silicone products and breast implant manufacturer, announced the discontinuation of five implant-grade silicones, but would continue producing 45 other, medical-grade, silicone materials—three years later, in 1995, the Dow Corning Corporation went bankrupt when it faced large class action lawsuits claiming a variety of illnesses.

- In 1997, the U.S. Department of Health and Human Services (HHS) appointed the Institute of Medicine (IOM) of the U.S. National Academy of Sciences (NAS) to investigate the potential risks of operative and post-operative complications from the emplacement of silicone breast implants. The IOM's review of the safety and efficacy of silicone gel-filled breast implants, reported that the "evidence suggests diseases or conditions, such as connective tissue diseases, cancer, neurological diseases, or other systemic complaints or conditions are no more common in women with breast implants, than in women without implants" subsequent studies and systemic review found no causal link between silicone breast implants and disease.
- In 1998, the U.S. FDA approved adjunct study protocols for silicone-gel filled implants only for breast reconstruction patients and for revision-surgery patients; and also approved the Dow Corning Corporation's Investigational Device Exemption (IDE) study for silicone-gel breast implants for a limited number of breast augmentation-, reconstruction-, and revision-surgery patients.
- In 1999, the Institute of Medicine published the Safety of Silicone Breast Implants (1999) study that reported no evidence that saline-filled and silicone-gel filled breast implant devices caused systemic health problems; that their use posed no new health or safety risks; and that local complications are "the primary safety issue with silicone breast implants", in distinguishing among routine and local medical complications and systemic health concerns."
- In 2000, the FDA approved saline breast implant Premarket Approval Applications (PMA) containing the type and rate data of the local medical complications experienced by the breast surgery patients. "Despite complications experienced by some women, the majority of those women still in the Inamed Corporation and Mentor Corporation studies, after three years, reported being satisfied with their implants." The premarket approvals were granted for breast augmentation, for women at least 18 years old, and for women requiring breast reconstruction.
- In 2006, for the Inamed Corporation and for the Mentor Corporation, the U.S. Food and Drug Administration lifted its restrictions against using silicone-gel breast implants for breast reconstruction and for augmentation mammoplasty. Yet, the approval was conditional upon accepting FDA monitoring, the completion of 10-year-mark studies of the women who already had the breast implants, and the completion of a second, 10-year-mark study of the safety of the breast implants in 40,000 other women. The FDA warned the public that breast implants do carry medical risks, and recommended that women who undergo breast augmentation should periodically undergo MRI examinations to screen for signs of either shell rupture or of filler leakage, or both conditions; and ordered that breast surgery patients be provided with detailed, informational brochures explaining the medical risks of using silicone-gel breast implants.
- In March 2019, the FDA hosted a public meeting of their General and Plastic Surgery Devices Advisory Panel to discuss safety issues of silicone and saline breast implants, including BIA-ALCL and breast implant illness. One of the major topics of that public meeting was the evidence that Allergan BIOCELL textured breast implants were the type of breast implants most likely to cause BIA-ALCL. Following the committee meeting, the FDA requested that Allergan recall their BIOCELL textured breast implants and tissue expanders, and in July 2019 Allergan took those BIOCELL textured implants and expanders off the market. Allergan subsequently announced they would contact all customers who had purchased their products to ensure they were aware of the recall.

The U.S. Food and Drug Administration established the age ranges for women seeking breast implants; for breast reconstruction, silicone-gel filled implants and saline-filled implants were approved for women of all ages; for breast augmentation, saline implants were approved for women 18 years of age and older; silicone implants were approved for women 22 years of age and older. Because each breast implant device entails different medical risks, the minimum age of the patient for saline breast implants is different from the minimum age of the patient for silicone breast implants—because of the filler leakage and silent shell-rupture risks; thus, periodic MRI screening examinations are the recommended post-operative, follow-up therapy for the patient. In other countries, in Europe and Oceania, the national health ministries' breast implant policies do not endorse periodic MRI screening of asymptomatic patients, but suggest palpation proper—with or without an ultrasonic screening—to be sufficient post-operative therapy for most patients.

=== Injury controversy ===
Various female professional wrestlers have been confirmed to have obtained bodily injuries which resulted from breast implants being injured.

== See also ==
- Breast augmentation
- Breast enlargement supplements
- Breast reconstruction
- Breast reduction plasty
- Mastopexy (breast lift)
- Poly Implant Prothèse
- Polypropylene breast implants
- Trans-umbilical breast augmentation (TUBA)
