= List of body modifications =

This page contains a list of body modifications.

== Explicit ornaments ==
- Body piercing – permanent placement of jewelry through an artificial fistula; sometimes further modified by stretching
- Ear piercing – the most common type of body modification
- Pearling – also known as genital beading
- Neck ring – multiple neck rings or spiral are worn to give the effect of stretching the neck (in reality lowering the collarbones)
- Tattooing – injection of a pigment under the skin
- Teeth blackening
- Eye tattooing – injection of a pigment into the sclera
- Extraocular implant (eyeball jewelry) – the implantation of jewelry in the outer layer of the eye
- Surface piercing – a piercing where the entrance and exit holes are pierced through the same flat area of skin
- Microdermal implants
- Transdermal implant – implantation of an object below the dermis, but which exits the skin at one or more points

== Subdermal implants ==
- Subdermal implants – implantation of an object that resides entirely below the dermis, including horn implants

== Removal or split ==
- Hair cutting
- Hair removal
- Genital modification and mutilation:
  - Female genital mutilation
  - Clitoral hood reduction – removal of the clitoral hood
  - Clitoridectomy – removal of the clitoris
  - Infibulation – removal of the external genitalia (and suturing of the vulva)
  - Labiaplasty – alteration (removal, reduction, enhancement, or creation) of the labia
  - Circumcision – the partial or full removal of the foreskin, sometimes also the frenulum
  - Foreskin restoration – techniques for attempting the restoration of the foreskin
  - Emasculation – complete removal of the male genitalia (orchiectomy plus penectomy)
  - Genital frenectomy
  - Meatotomy – splitting of the underside of the glans penis
  - Orchiectomy – removal of the testicles
  - Penectomy – removal of the penis
  - Subincision – splitting of the underside of the penis, also called urethrotomy
- Nipple removal
- Nipple splitting
- Nullification – the voluntary removal of body parts. Body parts that are commonly removed by those practicing body nullification include the penis, testicles, clitoris, labia and nipples. Sometimes people who desire a nullification may be diagnosed with gender dysphoria, body integrity identity disorder or apotemnophilia.
- Lingual frenectomy – this is to expand the external physical protrusion of the tongue.
- Tongue splitting – bisection of the tongue similar to a snake

== Applying long-term force ==
Some body modifications are the result of long-term activities or practices involved in applying force, such as constriction, to a part of the body.

- Tightlacing – binding of the waist and shaping of the torso
- Cranial binding – modification of the shape of infants' heads, now extremely rare
- Breast ironing – Pressing (sometimes with a heated object) the breasts of a pubescent female to prevent their growth.
- Foot binding – compression of the feet of girls to modify them for aesthetic reasons
- Breast implants
- Jelqing – penis enlargement with physical exercises by using a milking motion, to enhance girth mainly over a period of two to three months; no weights or spacing devices are used
- Non-surgical elongation of organs by prolonged stretching using weights or spacing devices. Some cultural traditions prescribe for or encourage members of one sex (or both) to have one organ stretched till permanent re-dimensioning has occurred, such as:
  - The 'giraffe-like' stretched necks (sometimes also other organs) of women among the Burmese Kayan tribe, the result of wearing brass coils around them. This compresses the collarbone and upper ribs but is not medically dangerous. It is a myth that removing the rings will cause the neck to 'flop'; Padaung women remove them regularly for cleaning etc.
  - Stretching body piercings to deliberately expand them.
    - Stretched lip piercings – achieved by inserting ever larger plates, such as those made of clay used by some Amazonian tribes.
  - Labia stretching or pulling to enhance sexual pleasure by stimulation, particularly reaching an orgasm that squirts, multiple orgasms that flow together frequently upon climax.
  - Foreskin restoration or stretching to increase its physical size, desensitize the foreskin, move the foreskin further down the head for enhanced sensitivity and improve its appearance.

== Others ==
- Human branding – controlled burning or cauterizing of tissue to encourage intentional scarring
- Ear shaping (which includes cropping, ear pointing or "elfing")
- Scarification – cutting or removal of dermis with the intent to encourage intentional scarring or keloiding
- Human tooth sharpening – generally used to have the appearance of some sort of animal.
- Yaeba – the deliberate misaligning or capping of teeth to give a crooked appearance. Popular in Japan.
- Tooth ablation or tooth-knocking – the act of deliberately knocking one's teeth out, often as a rite of passage or to satisfy an aesthetic ideal. Commonly practiced among Australian Aboriginals and Native Hawaiians prior to the 20th century, and observed in archaeological complexes around the world.

== Gallery ==
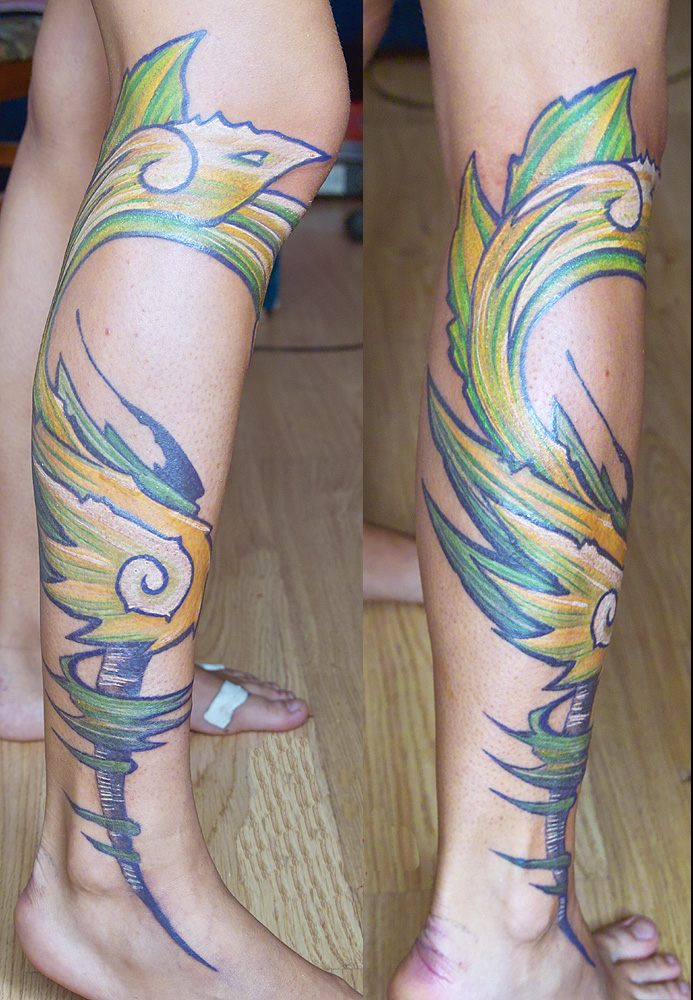
Tattooed ankles

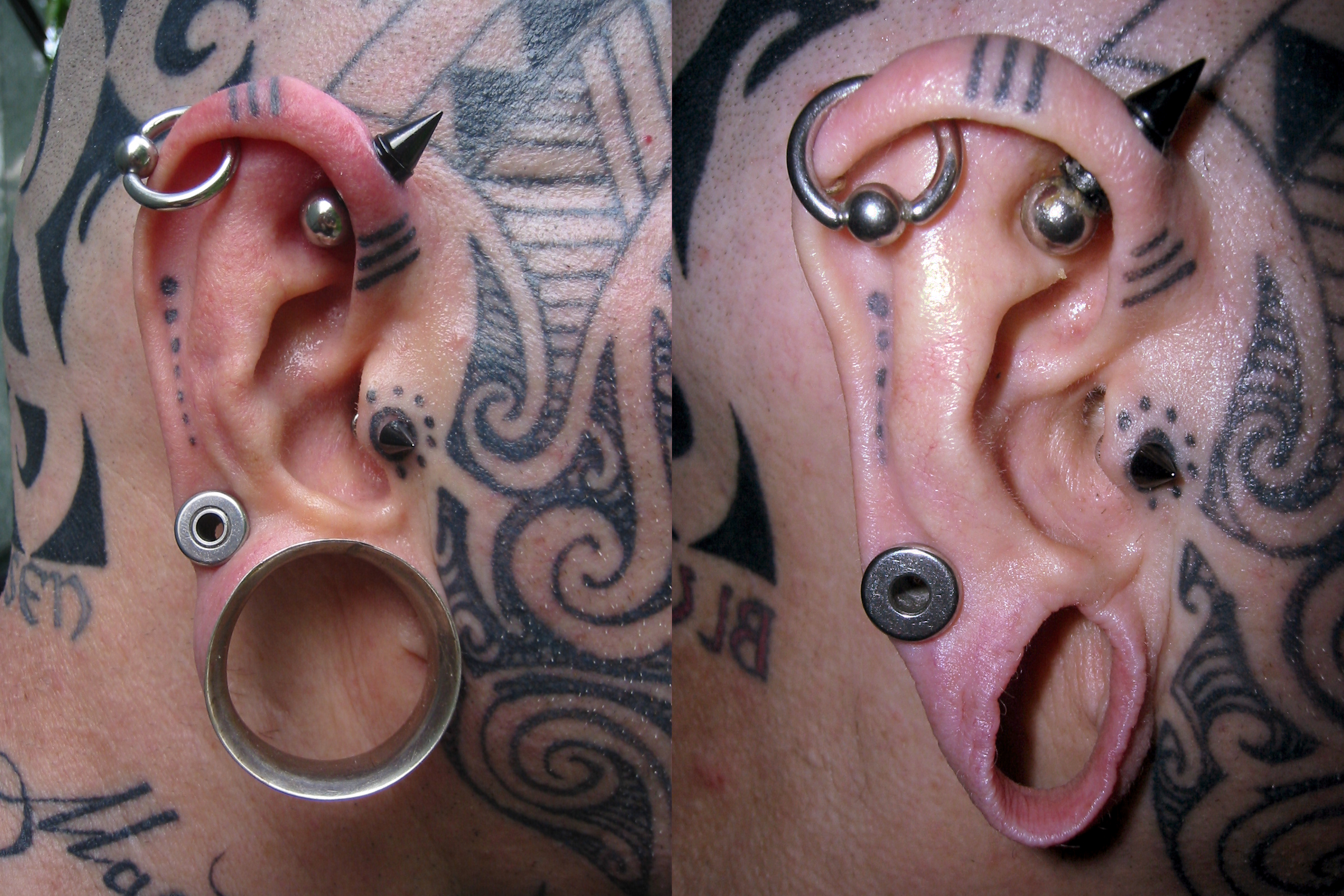
Ear piercing and stretching

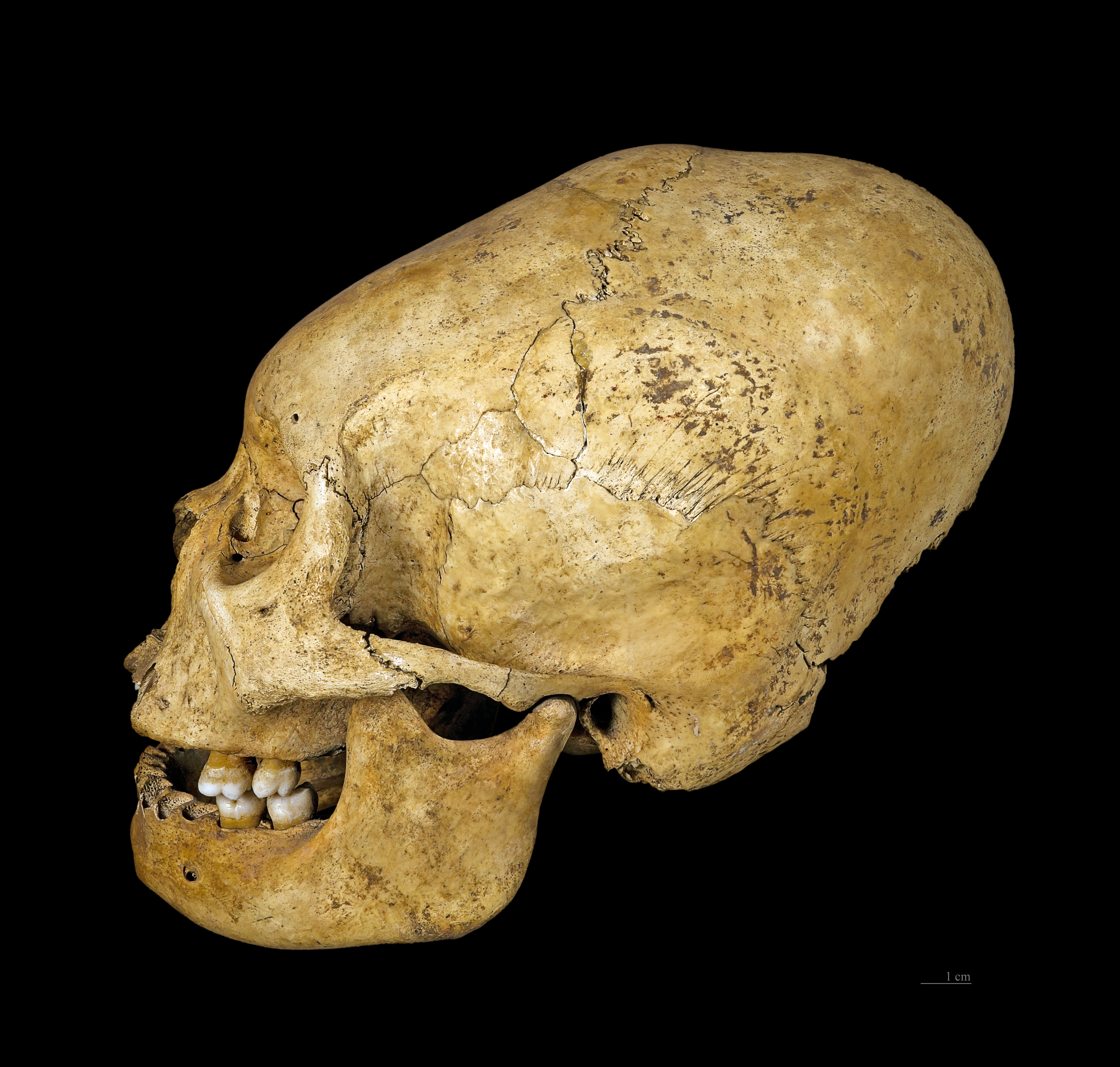
Proto Nazca modified skull, c. 200–100 BC

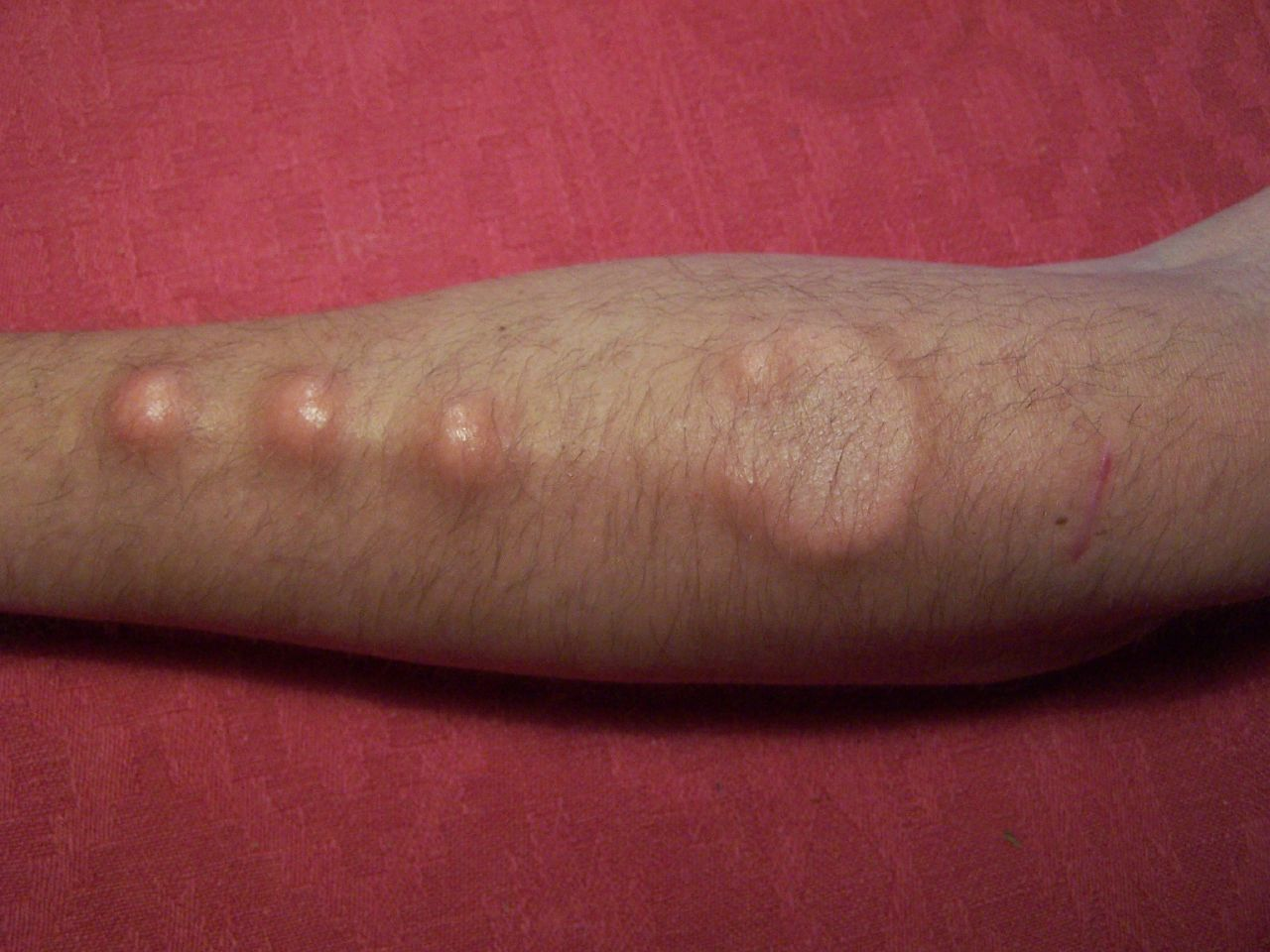
Subdermal implant

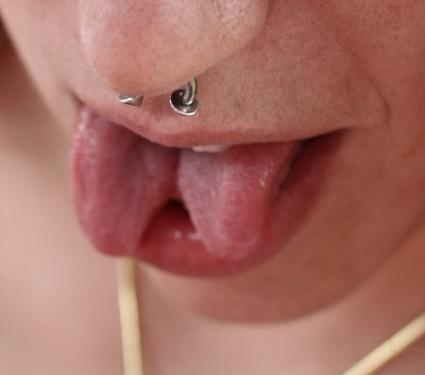
Tongue splitting

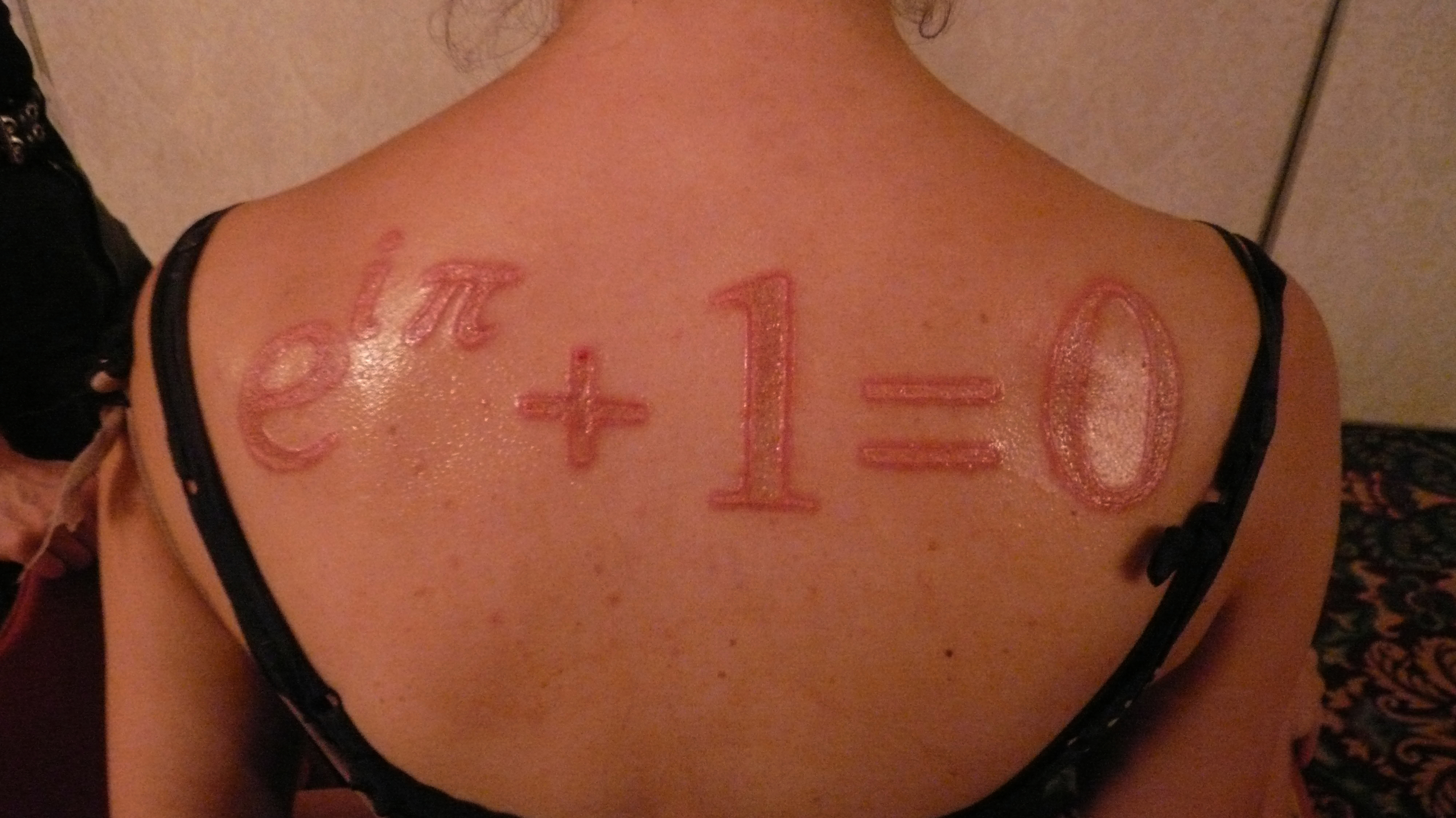
Scarification

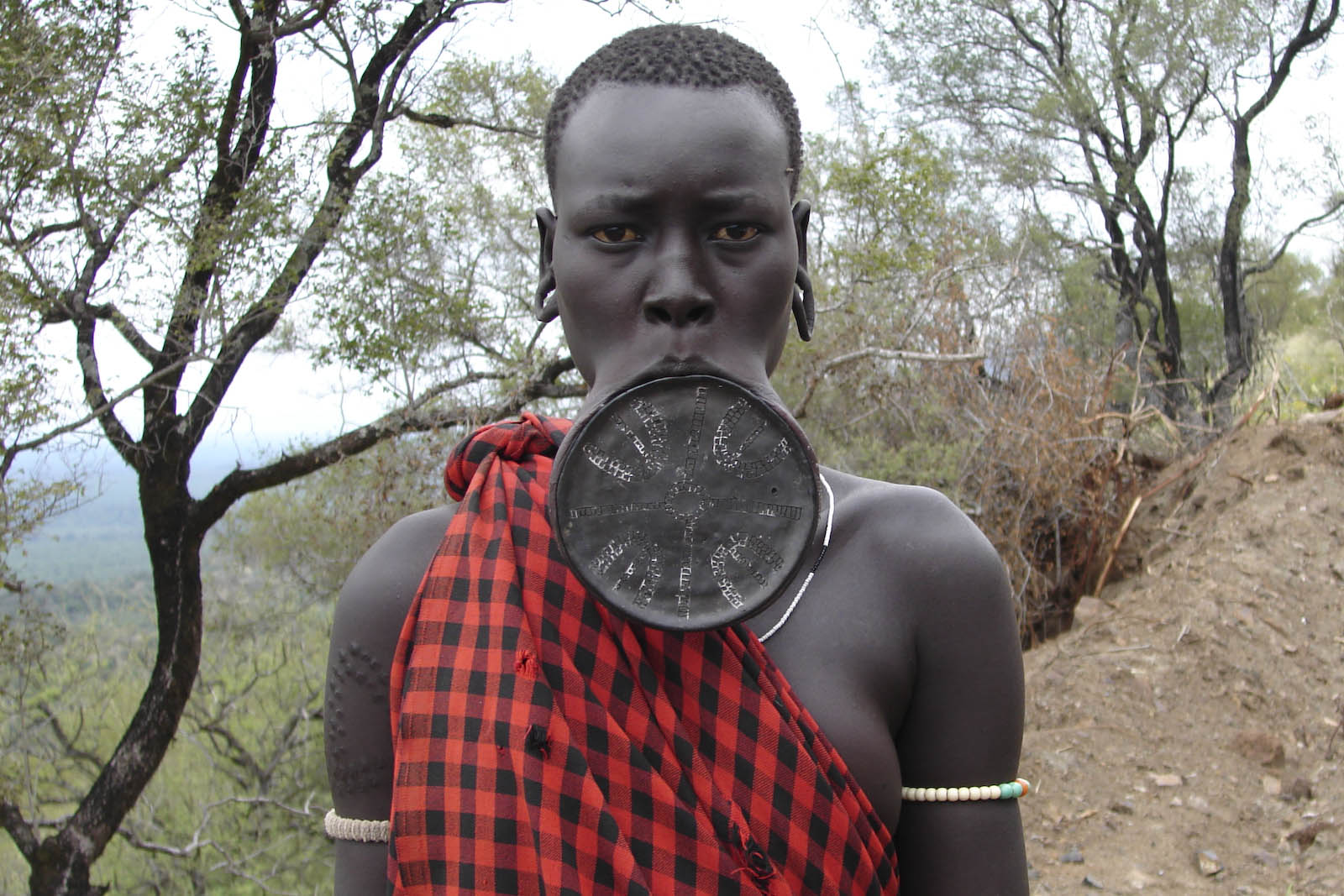
Mursi woman wearing a lip plate in Ethiopia

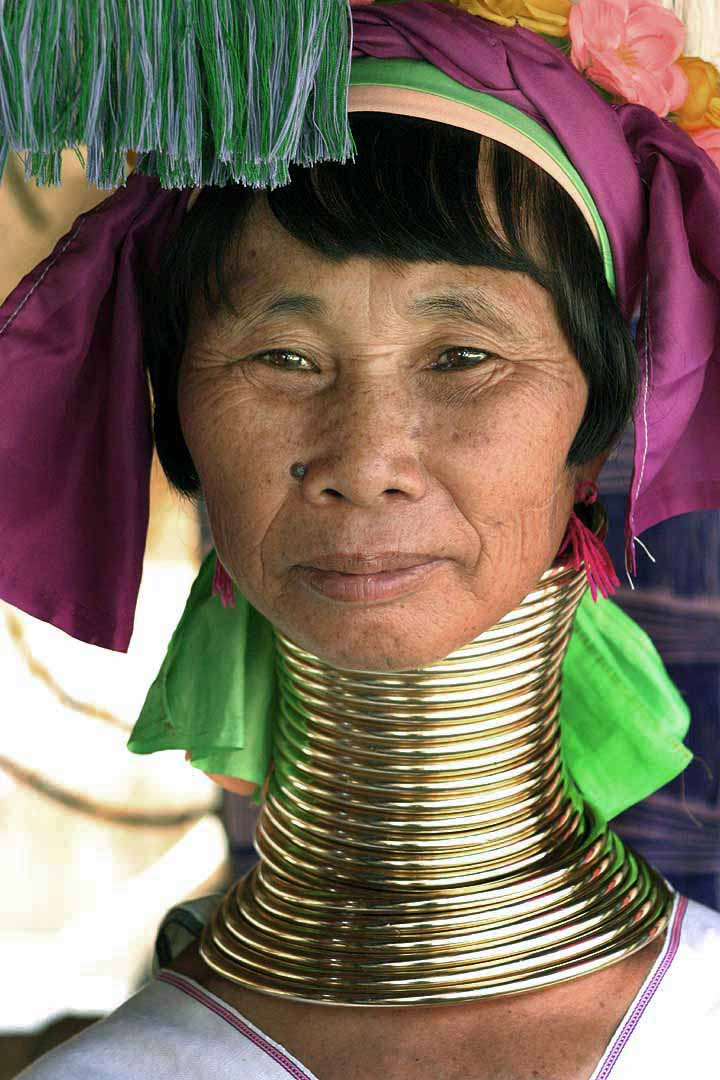
Kayan woman with neck rings
