= Stalking Cat =

American man with extensive body modifications

- Born: Dennis Avner; August 27, 1958; Flint, Michigan, U.S.
- Died: November 5, 2012 (aged 54); Tonopah, Nevada, U.S.
- Known for: Body modifications

Stalking Cat (born Dennis Avner; August 27, 1958 – November 5, 2012) was an American man known for his extensive body modifications, which were intended to increase his resemblance to a tiger. For his 14 surgical procedures towards that goal, he held a world record for "most permanent transformations to look like an animal". "Stalking Cat" was his chosen name.

== Biography ==
Avner was born in Flint, Michigan, and grew up in Suttons Bay, Michigan. As an adult, he joined the Navy as a sonar technician. He left his Navy post around 1981. He then began working as a computer programmer and technician in San Diego, California.

In the early 1980s, guided by his personal vision and feelings of affinity for the tigress, Stalking Cat began tattooing and surgically modifying his face. In interviews, he repeatedly stated that he chose to alter his physical appearance in accordance with what he believed was an ancient Wyandot tradition; however, this was his personal belief, not traditional practice. He also told people he grew up in a tribe and had been told to change his form to that of a tiger by a medicine man. Due to various medical laws, the procedures he had were performed without anaesthetic.

While living in San Diego, he met Tess Calhoun at a furry convention. Over several years, he formed a close friendship with Calhoun and her husband, Rick Weiss. In 2005, Weiss's job with Boeing required the couple to move to Washington, and they asked Stalking Cat, then aged 47, to join them. The trio moved to Freeland, Washington, on Whidbey Island, where Stalking Cat helped fix up their house.

Stalking Cat, Calhoun, and Weiss were active in the furry community, both online and at conventions. They held monthly gatherings for members of the furry community at their home. He had financial troubles, and in August 2007, he posted publicly on his online journal that he needed a new place to live. Calhoun posted that she and her husband simply could not afford to support him anymore. She also posted that they would be throwing him a send-off party. In September 2007, at age 49, Stalking Cat moved to Tonopah, Nevada.

== Death ==
On November 5, 2012, Stalking Cat was found dead in his garage, with a gun on the floor. He was 54 years old. News of the death became public one week later. In an online post, BMEzine founder Shannon Larratt wrote that his death was a suicide.

== Body modifications ==
=== Description of modifications ===
Many of Stalking Cat's body modifications were performed by Arizona-based artist Steve Haworth. The first artist to begin the extensive tattoo work on Stalking Cat's face was Larry Hanks in San Diego, California, who started the work in 1985. He had over 14 types of modifications, including:

- Extensive tattooing, including facial tattooing
- Facial subdermal implants to change the shape of his brow, forehead, and the bridge of his nose
- Flattening his nose, via septum relocation
- Silicone injection in his lips, cheeks, chin, and other parts of his face
- Bifurcating (splitting) his upper lip
- Filing and capping his teeth
- Surgically shaping his ears, making his ears pointed and his earlobes elongated
- Surgical hairline modification
- Piercing his upper lip and transdermal implants on his forehead, to facilitate wearing whiskers
- Wearing green contact lenses with slit irises
- Wearing a robotic tail

Future modification plans included implants on top of his head, to facilitate the mounting of tiger-like ears.

=== Medical ethics concerns ===
Glenn McGee, director of the Center for Bioethics at Albany Medical College in New York, said: "Cosmetic surgery is a practice based on informed consent that needs to balance the risks with the benefits. It is possible to have a coherent view that is nonetheless detrimental to one's well-being. This is a patient who's being harmed by medicine in the interest of his tradition."

== See also ==
- Tom Leppard
- Katzen
- Lucky Diamond Rich
- The Enigma
- The Lizardman (performer)
