= Implant (body modification) =

Device placed under human skin for decorative purposes

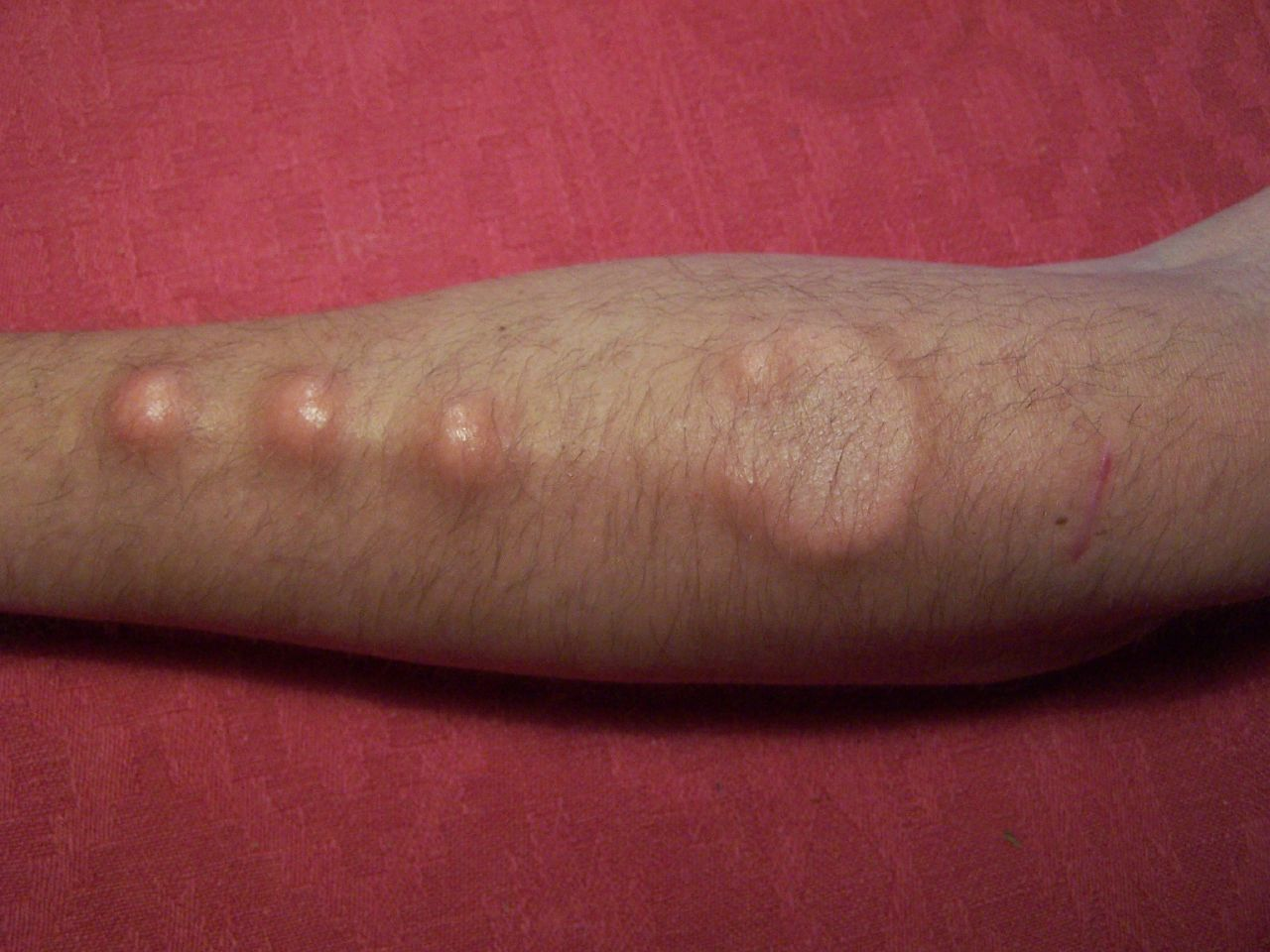
Implants in the arm.

In body modification, an implant is a device that is placed under the human skin for decorative purposes. Such implants may be subdermal or transdermal. In the context of body modification, some may consider injections of silicone and other substances a type of implant as well.

Some types of implants may be performed by doctors or other medical professionals, while others are performed by body modification artists.

== Implants and procedures ==
=== Clavicle or collarbone piercing ===
A very deep piercing that passes beneath the collarbone, and therefore enters the body cavity. These are highly prone to rejection as the collarbone placement is a high movement area. Also, because of the depth of the piercing—going deep under the collarbone and through a large amount of flesh and muscle—healing is difficult. With all the movement in the area the fistula cannot heal properly, and will hurt far worse than a hip piercing.

=== Deep chest piercing ===
A deep chest piercing is a long piercing that passes under the skin of the chest and may be several inches long.

=== Eyeball implant ===
An eyeball implant, or extraocular implant, is a cosmetic implant involving a tiny piece of decorative jewelry which is implanted within the superficial, interpalpebral conjunctiva of the human eye (the covering of the white of the eye, in the area that is normally visible between the eyelids). Such implants are illegal in the United States.

=== Flesh stapling, flesh plating and pocketing ===
A flesh staple is a type of piercing jewelry or implant in which the middle rather than the end of the jewelry is exposed when worn. The jewelry resembles a staple, the ends of which pierce the skin and hold the item in place.

A flesh plate works on the same principle, but has a different shape, resembling a flat plate rather than a staple.

Flesh pocketing resembles flesh stapling, but instead of staple-like geometry, small "pockets" under the skin hold the ends of the jewelry in place. Pocketing has a lower rate of success than stapling.

=== Genital beading and genital ribs ===
Genital beading (also known as yakuza beads, love beads or pearling) is a process in which beads or other small objects are implanted beneath the shaft skin of the penis. Genital ribs are short, slightly curved rods of various materials such as stainless steel, titanium, teflon, or silicone placed under the shaft skin of the penis.

=== Horn implants ===
In this modification, small pieces of Teflon, coral or silicone are inserted beneath the skin of the forehead, giving the appearance of small horns. These can be gradually replaced with larger and larger pieces as the skin stretches, creating larger horns. Coral is no longer used for larger horns, as it tends to be too brittle.

The first set of horn implants were done by Steve Haworth on The Enigma. Steve Haworth invented this type of modification. He currently uses silicone for his horn implants.

=== Magnetic implants ===
An experimental procedure in which small neodymium magnets are placed under the skin (usually the fingertips) mostly for the purpose of sensory experimentation, in which the movement of the implant in the presence of magnetic fields can be felt by the individual. Such implants can, in this way, be employed to convert non-human sensory information, such as sonar/distance, into touch. They have been proposed for attaching objects such as eyeglasses or jewelry to the skin, but in practice this has turned out not to be feasible, as the skin is damaged by being crushed between the object and the magnet.

=== Scrotal implant ===
A scrotal implant is an implant placed into the scrotum. The implants may be designed for this purpose (for example, Neuticles), or be of any implant-grade material.

=== Subdermal implant ===
Subdermal implants, objects inserted under the skin, are used in medical applications such as pacemakers and the Norplant contraceptive. There is also historical evidence that some tribal cultures would insert stones or metal underneath the skin for ritualistic purposes. In the early 1990s, body modification artist Steve Haworth conceived of inserting 3D art implants in various shapes under the skin to create a decorative appearance. He started with surgical steel and moved on to teflon and then carved silicone, and now uses injection-molded implant-grade silicone that he produces. Other artists have since manufactured silicone implants using water jet cutting or "cookie cutter", but these often have undesirably sharp edges which can damage the skin.

Subdermal implants are usually installed by creating a hole in the skin which is expanded to allow insertion of the object, and then sutured closed. Magnets and RFID transmitters (like in the case of Kevin Warwick) have also been implanted in humans using this method.

=== Surface piercing ===
A surface piercing is a piercing that travels beneath the surface of the skin (on the arm, for example) rather than through a protruding portion of the anatomy such as the earlobe. Surface piercings can be placed on nearly any area of the body, provided they are not subject to too much movement or the risk of impact damage or infection from contact with contaminants such as dirt. A surface piercing should be done with high grade titanium in a staple shaped bar. Curved barbells or straight barbells put too much pressure on the entry holes to be suitable. Once a surface piercing bar is in, it is recommended that you not attempt to remove or change the staple shaped bar yourself; this should be done only by a highly trained and experienced piercer. The balls, however, are safe for the wearer to change.

Surface piercings can be more or less prone to rejection, depending on where on the body they are situated. For example, the nape of the neck is less likely to reject a surface piercing than the sternum. Microdermals (see below) and Skin Divers are becoming more popular than surface piercings, as they last much longer and are less likely to be rejected.

=== Transdermal implant ===
A transdermal implant (or percutaneous implant), also known as a microdermal implant or surface anchor, is an implant incorporating a flat plate that sits beneath the skin with an externally visible portion incorporating a bead, spike or other item that appears to float on the surface of the skin. Due to the fact that the skin is held open by the metal and a fistula must form around it, similar to a piercing on a larger scale, healing can sometimes be difficult or lengthy. If the practitioner is skilled and the person receiving the modification takes good care of it, it can have a high success rate. The first transdermal implant was a "Metal Mohawk" performed on Joe Aylward by Steve Haworth in 1996. Aylward retained his transdermal "mohawk" for almost a decade, until, for personal reasons, he asked Haworth to remove it.

== See also ==
- Breast implant
