= Lip plate =

Form of body modification

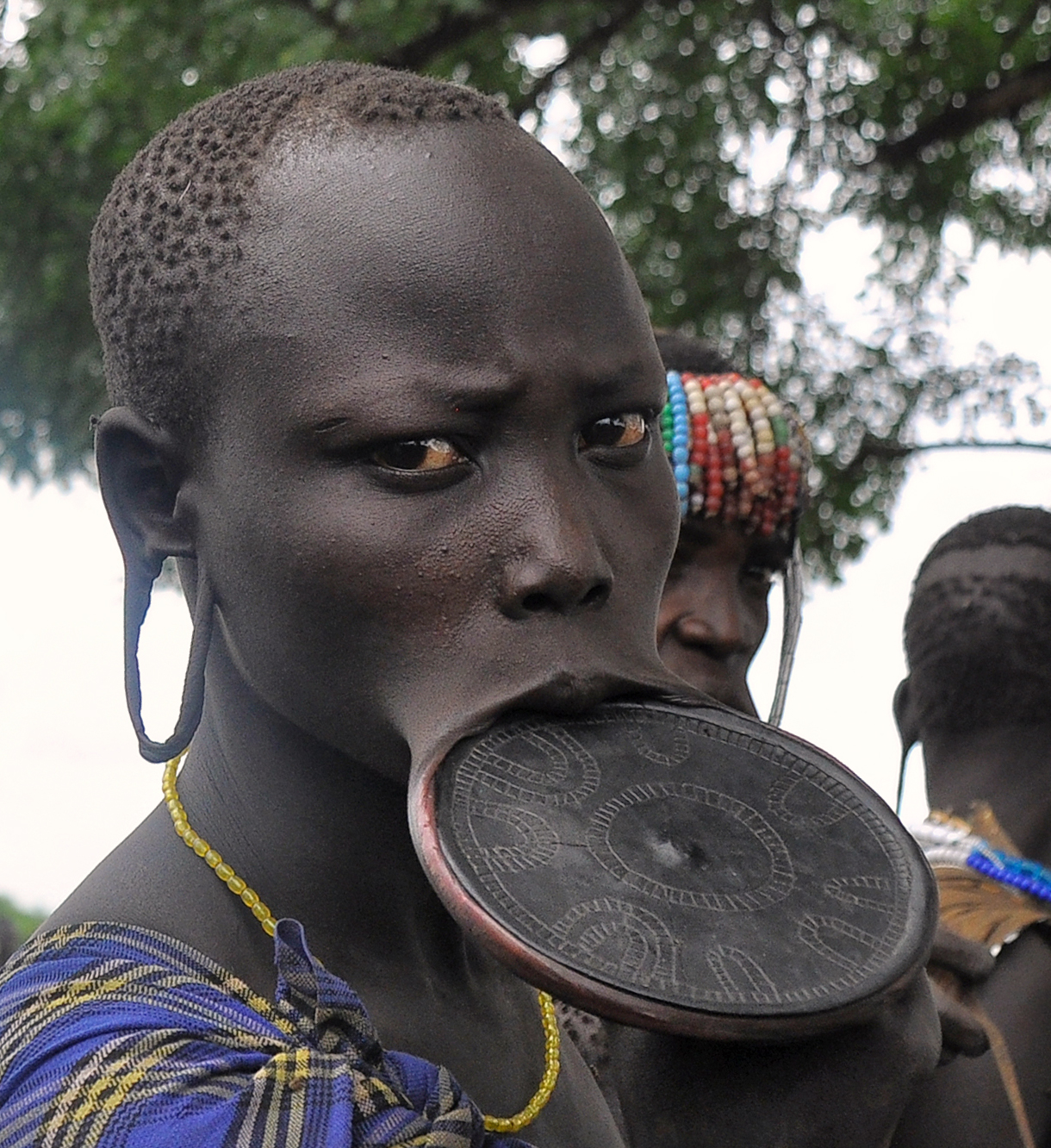
- Mursi woman with lip plate (2014)
- Nicknames: Labret, lip plate, lip disc
- Jewelry: Clay, wood or metal disc

A lip plate, also known as a lip disc, mouth plate, or lip plug, is a form of body modification. Increasingly large discs (usually circular, and made from clay or wood) are inserted into a pierced hole in either the upper or lower lip, or both, thereby stretching it. The term labret denotes all kinds of pierced-lip ornaments, including plates and plugs.

Archaeological evidence indicates that disk and plate labrets have been invented multiple times including in Africa (Sudan and Ethiopia; 6000–5500 BCE), Mesoamerica (1500 BCE), and coastal Ecuador (500 BCE).

== Usage in Africa ==
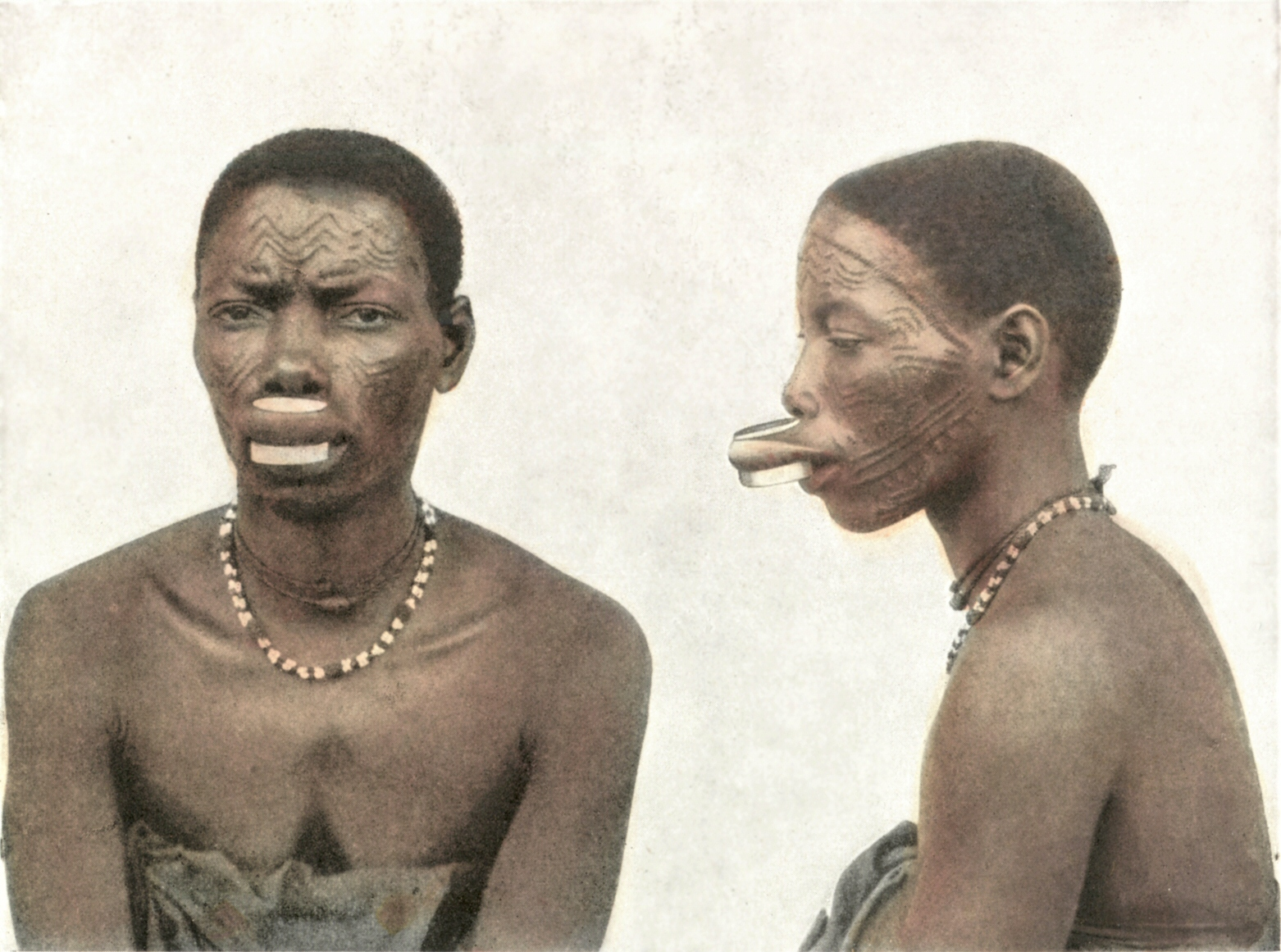
Makonde woman with lip plate

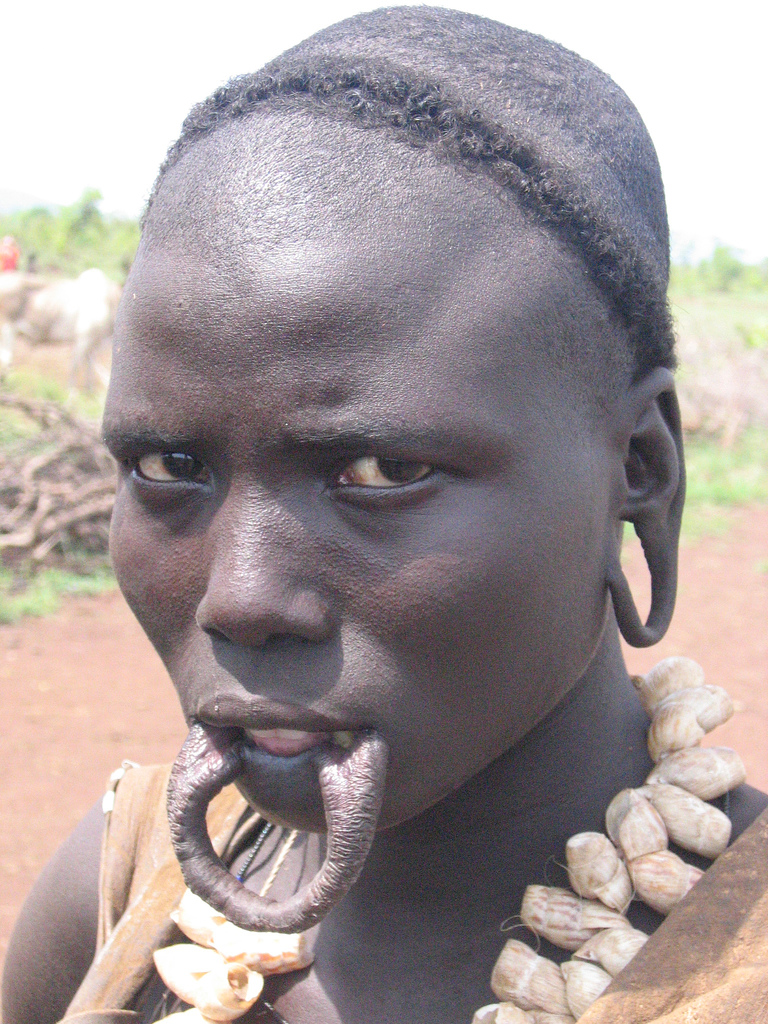
Contemporary Mursi woman showing pierced lower lip without a lip plate

In some African countries, a lower lip plate is usually combined with the dental extraction of two lower front teeth, sometimes all four. Among the Sara people and Lobi of Chad, a plate is also inserted into the upper lip. Other tribes, such as the Makonde people of Tanzania, Kenya and Mozambique, used to wear a plate in the upper lip only.

Many sources have suggested that the plate's size was a sign of social or economical importance in some tribes. However, because of natural mechanical attributes of human skin, the plate's size may often depend on the stage of stretching of the lip and the wishes of the wearer.

=== Ethiopia ===
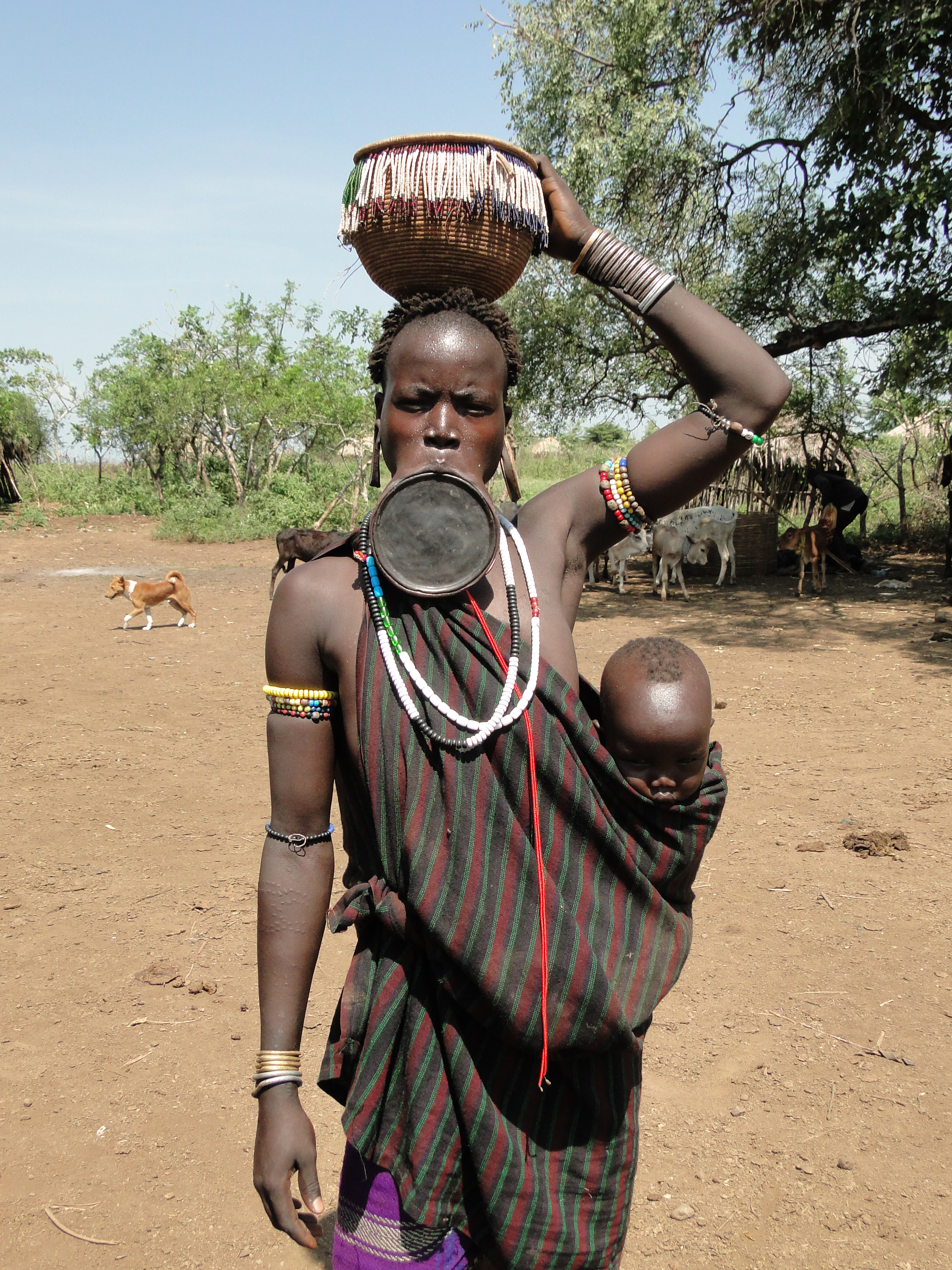
Mursi woman wearing a lip plate in Ethiopia

Among the Surma and Mursi people of the lower Omo River valley in Ethiopia, about 6 to 12 months before marriage, a young woman has her lip pierced by her mother or one of her kinswomen, usually at around the age of 15 to 18. The initial piercing is done as an incision of the lower lip of 1 to 2 cm length, and a simple wooden peg is inserted. After the wound has healed, which usually takes between two and three weeks, the peg is replaced with a slightly bigger one. At a diameter of about 4 cm, the first lip plate made of clay is inserted. Every woman crafts her own plate and takes pride in including some ornamentation. The final diameter ranges from about 8 cm to over 20 cm.

In 1990 Beckwith and Carter claimed that for Mursi and Surma women, the size of their lip plate indicates the number of cattle paid as the bride price. Anthropologist David Turton, who studied the Mursi for 30 years, disproved this idea. LaTosky argues that most Mursi women use lip plates, and the value of the ornamentation lies within a discourse of female strength and self-esteem.

In contemporary culture, most girls of age 13 to 18 appear to decide whether or not to wear a lip plate. This adornment has caused the Mursi and Surma women to be treated as if they are a tourist attraction.

The largest lip plate recorded was in Ethiopia, measuring 59.5 cm (23.4 in) in circumference and 19.5 cm (7.6 in) wide, in 2014. It belongs to Ataye Eligidagne.

== Usage in the Americas ==
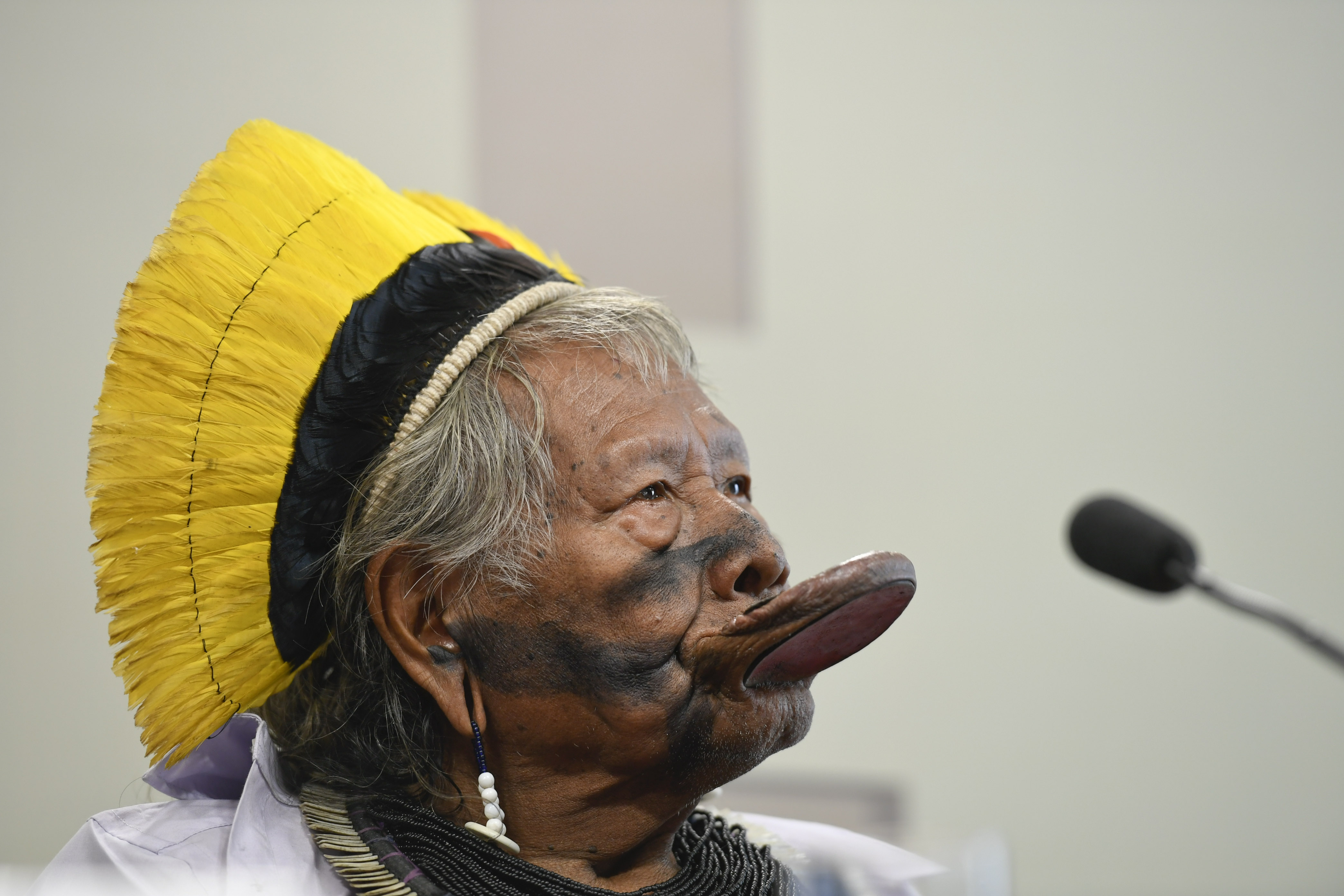
Raoni Metuktire, a Kayapo man, speaking at the Brazilian Commission on Human Rights and Participatory Legislation

In South America among some Amazonian tribes, young males traditionally have their lips pierced and begin to wear plates when they enter the men's house and leave the world of women. Lip plates there are associated with oration and singing. The largest plates are worn by the greatest orators and war chiefs, such as Chief Raoni of the Kayapo tribe, a well known environmental campaigner. In South America, lip plates are nearly always made from light wood.

In the Pacific Northwest of North America, labrets have a long history of use, dating back at least five thousand years. At times they were used by both men and women, but in more recent times (e.g. 19th century) were associated with exclusive use by high ranking women. Among the Haida, Tsimshian, and Tlingit, they were once used by women to symbolize social maturity by indicating a girl's eligibility to be a wife. The installation of a girl's first plate was celebrated with a sumptuous feast.

In western nations, some young people, including some members of the Modern Primitive movement, have adopted larger-gauge lip piercings, a few large enough for them to wear proper lip plates. Some examples are given on the BME website.

== Health concern ==
This practice can lead to infections, especially during the process of perforation. It also complicates normal mouth functions such as salivating and eating. Gum irritation can also arise as consequence from plate rubbing, leading to related gum diseases and infections. Teeth gapping and erosion could happen as well.

For this reason, the Ethiopian government has put pressure on suppressing the practice.

== List of traditional wearers ==
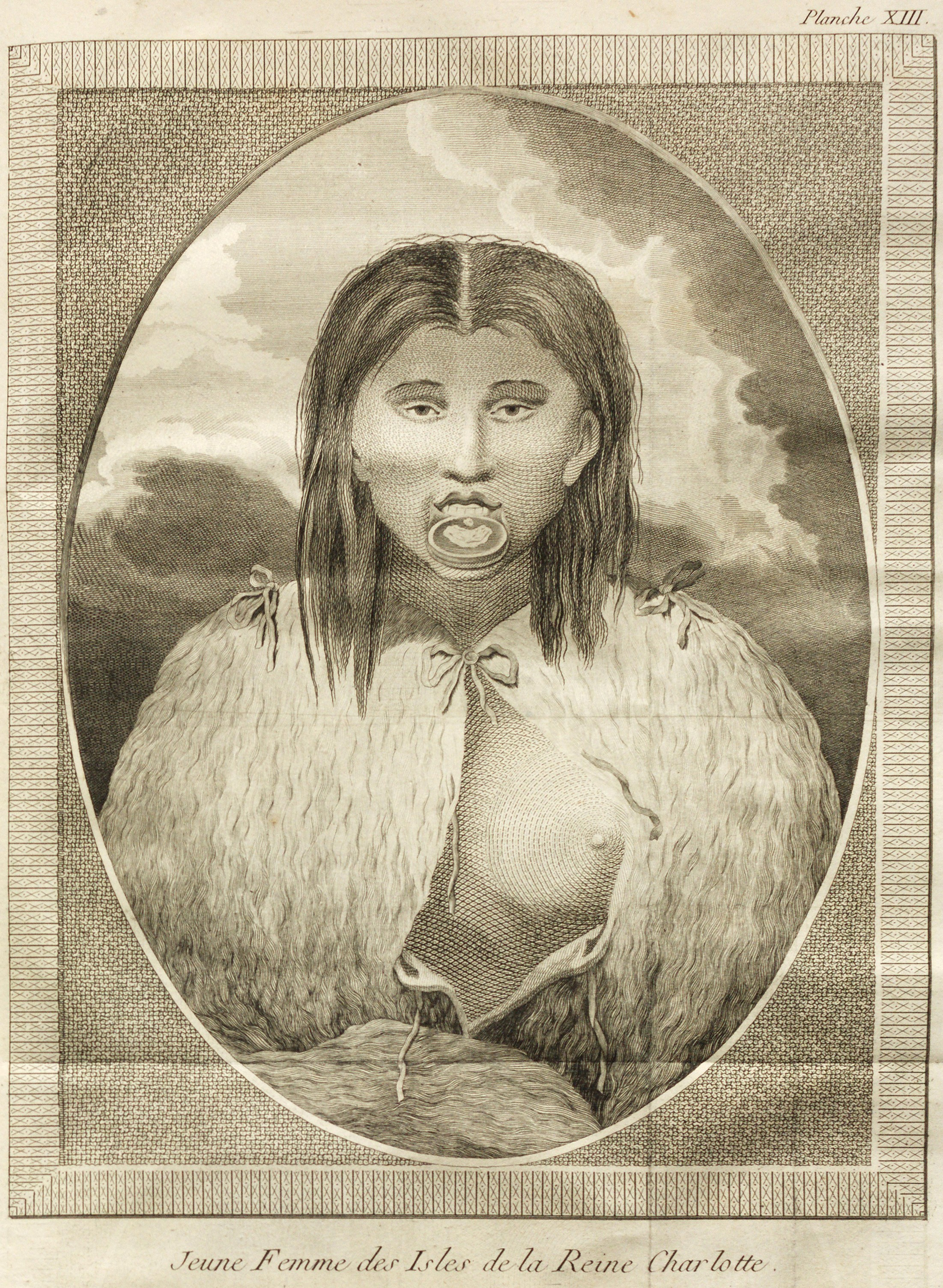
Young Haida woman with lip plate, portrayed in George Dixon's Voyage autour du monde (1789)

Tribes that are known for their traditional lip plates or labrets include:

- The Mursi and Surma (Suri) women of Ethiopia.
- The Sara women of Chad (ceased wearing plates in the 1920s).
- The Makonde of Tanzania, Mozambique and Kenya (ceased wearing plates several decades ago).
- The Suyá men of Brazil (most no longer wear plates).
- The Botocudo of coastal Brazil (in previous centuries, both sexes wore plates).
- Aleut, Inuit and other indigenous peoples of Northern Canada, Alaska and surrounding regions also wore large labrets; these practices had mostly ceased by the twentieth century.
- Some tribes (Zo'e in Brazil, Guarani, Tupi, and Chiriguano. Nuba in Sudan, Lobi in West Africa) wear stretched-lip ornaments that are plug- or rod-shaped rather than plate-shaped, known as tembetá.

== Ubangi misnomer ==
In the late nineteenth and early twentieth centuries, African women wearing lip plates were brought to Europe and North America for exhibit in circuses and sideshows. Around 1930, Ringling Brothers and Barnum & Bailey promoted such women from the French Congo as members of the "Ubangi" tribe; the Ringling press agent admitted that he picked that name from a map for its exotic sound. The word was used in this way in the 1937 Marx Brothers film A Day at the Races and also appears in the same context in the song "Colored Spade" from the musical Hair. The word Ubangi was still given a definition as an African tribe in 2009 in some English-language dictionaries.
