= Larratt =

Larratt is a surname. Notable people with the surname include:

- Devon Larratt (born 1975), Canadian professional arm wrestler
- Shannon Larratt (1973–2013), Canadian writer and artist

== See also ==
- James Larratt Battersby (1907–1955), British fascist and pacifist
