= Steve Haworth =

American body modification artist

- Occupation: body modification artist & flesh engineer
- Known for: inventor of 3D body modification
- Website: http://www.stevehaworth.com/

Steve Haworth is a body modification artist based in Phoenix, Arizona. He is partially responsible for the modern / western popularization of subdermal and transdermal implants, such as the "Metal Mohawk".

== Career ==
Steve Haworth's father was a manufacturer of surgical equipment, and Steve Haworth continued in the family business, eventually branching into piercing jewelry and body modification instruments. He is known for inventing and popularizing some subdermal and transdermal implants, such as the "Metal Mohawk". Haworth formed a company called Haworth Med Tech in the late 1980s to produce medical equipment, later called HTC (Haworth Tech Company), which had subsidiaries of HTC Body Jewelry and the HTC piercing studios. He sold the HTC piercing studios in May 2005 and retired from regular piercing, preferring to concentrate on 3D implants and other types of body modification. He continues to manufacture body jewelry and tools for body modification. He and his business partner Jesse Jarrell create unique silicone jewelry for large-gauge piercing with their company Kaos Softwear.

He designed specialized medical instruments called dermal elevators for this process. He has also done pioneering work with surface bars, ear shaping, tongue splitting, magnetic implants, and artistic branding (using electrosurgical units). He has worked on individuals noted for their extensive modifications such as The Enigma, Katzen, Stalking Cat, The Lizardman, and biohacker Tim Cannon. He is listed in the Guinness World Records as "Most Advanced Body Modification Artist", 1999 to present.

Haworth travels around the country and the world frequently, and conducts seminars on his body modification techniques. He founded the body suspension group Life Suspended and performs suspensions with them on a regular basis. He is also the co-founder of the production company Horns & Halos, which puts on several fetish-themed events every year.

== Impact ==
Many other respected artists in the body modification community cite Haworth as an inspiration. Fellow body modification artist Samppa von Cyborg says that "He's the most important, most respected body modder out there." Shawn Porter of Scar Wars explains, "I directly credit Steve’s [electrosurgery] branding as a main influence on the newer generation of scarification artists; his high detail branding (which caused a stir when it was featured in In the Flesh, Body Art, and Bizarre) showed people that you could do more than just dots, chevrons and geometric shapes." According to Ron Garza, a respected scarification artist, "Steve has always been a pioneer and innovator. He has made a huge contribution to the modification community as a whole..."

Haworth is the subject of the 2007 documentary Flesh & Blood by director Larry Silverman and also appears in the 2005 documentary Modify. He has appeared on the TV shows Extreme Dr. 90210, Ripley's Believe it or Not, and Secret Lives of Women, among others. His work has had cultural impact such that Lady Gaga appeared in her video for "Born This Way" and in concerts and interviews wearing fake versions of subdermal implants.
