= Extraocular implant =

Cosmetic implant of decorative jewelry into the human eye

An extraocular implant (also known as eyeball jewelry) is a cosmetic implant involving a tiny piece of decorative jewelry which is implanted within the superficial, interpalpebral conjunctiva or sclera of the human eye.

== History and culture ==
Eyeball jewelry was developed first in the Netherlands as a radical new form of body modification in 2002. It was first designed at the Netherlands Institute for Innovative Ocular Surgery and is marketed there under the name JewelEye. The procedure is completely legal in the Netherlands, as long as it is performed by a licensed ophthalmologist under sterile conditions.

In Canada, multiple provinces have passed laws banning eyeball jewelry and scleral tattooing due to potential health risks, including Ontario and Saskatchewan.

== Procedure ==
Unlike subdermal implants and other new body modification procedures, the extraocular implant is currently only being performed in a medical clinic environment. The procedure is relatively quick, but it does require that both eyes be immobilized with anesthetic drops, and that the layers of the eyeball where the implant is situated must be separated by the injection of liquid. As very few people have undergone this procedure, and it is relatively new, the long term health effects are currently unknown.

However, the Website of the Netherlands Institute for Innovative Ocular Surgery states that the implant does not interfere with the ocular functions, i.e. the visual performance and mobility. Additionally, patient satisfaction remains high and no side effects of the treatment have been noticed with a follow-up of more than one year.

== Jewelry ==
Currently, the only supplier of jewelry for this implant is Hippocratech b.v., a company in Rotterdam, Netherlands. The implant is manufactured from a platinum alloy and is available in several basic shapes, including the Euro sign, heart, musical note, clover or star shapes, with other shapes custom made by the company upon request. The size of the jewellery is about 1/8" (3 mm) across.
