= BMEzine =

Online body modification magazine

- Website type: Online magazine
- Available in: English
- Owners: BMEzine.com, LLC
- Creator: Group
- Website: bmezine.com
- Commercial: Yes
- Registration: Optional
- Launched: 1994
- Current status: Active

Body Modification Ezine (BME) is an online magazine devoted to body modification, noted for its coverage of the extreme and fringes of body modification and erotic body play.

== History and content ==
BME was started as a web site hosted at Internex Online on December 6, 1994, by Shannon Larratt and was the first body modification website.

BME was expanded in 2000 by the addition of IAM.BMEzine, an online community, which hosts blogs specifically for members of the body-modification community.

In late 2005, BME added both a video sister site, BMEvideo and a body modification blog, Modblog.BMEzine.com.

The site often publishes hoax articles each year on April Fools' Day.

Both Shannon and Rachel Larratt have cameo appearances in the Kevin Smith feature Clerks II.

On May 14, 2008, Shannon Larratt posted onto ModBlog that he would no longer be an employee of BME.

On March 15, 2013, it was announced that Shannon Larratt had died.

== BME BBQs ==
Patrons of the BME website and its IAM community have often gathered for barbecues where they can meet with one another. Historically, the largest of these BBQs, known as BMEFest, were held in or around Toronto, Ontario and generally on Canada Day with hundreds of participants. The festivities of BMEFest almost always include suspensions, fireworks, grilled food both vegan and otherwise, and there is usually a commemorative T-shirt for each event. It is generally free to attend but it is encouraged to sign up ahead of time and may be exclusive to a private group.

== Censorship ==
The BME site is blocked by many Internet filtering services intended to protect children (and workplaces), for reasons such as nudity, torture, and other adult content. It was banned by Germany's Bundesprüfstelle für jugendgefährdende Medien in 1999 as a "danger to the youth" because BME did not include age verification or an entrance page warning users of potential adult content. In December 2005, the German agency forced Google to remove the site from search results returned by www.google.de.

Shannon Larratt writes in Zentastic.com:

When Germany came after BME for "endangering the youth" and demanded that I make changes to the site to comply with German law, my response was to simply not visit Germany again (and I'm a German citizen). When the US started to pressure us, we moved all of our servers and presence out of the country and backed off on plans to live in the US. No changes were ever made to the site, and no images were ever removed — if anything, the pressure made me push those areas even more.
