= Church of Body Modification =

Non-theistic religion

- Abbreviation: CoBM
- Type: New religious movement
- Governance: Board of Advisors
- Origin: c. 2000, legally incorporated in 2008
- Members: 5,000+ (2020)
- Official website: Church of Body Modification Official Website

The Church of Body Modification is a non-theistic religion with over 5,000 members in 24 countries. The Church practices body modification to "strengthen the bond between mind, body, and soul" and to experience the divine.

== Practices and beliefs ==
The core belief of the Church of Body Modification is to create a strong spiritual bond between the mind, body, and soul. To ensure a strong connection, the Church uses both ancient and modern body-modification rituals to express its faith and help its members bring the three branches of life into harmony. The Church practices various types of body modification, such as piercings, tattoos, scarification, corsetry, hook pulling, hair dyeing, reconstructive and cosmetic surgery, fasting, and firewalking. It states that anything that pushes the flesh to its limits can be included in their list of rituals. The end goal is to live spiritually complete lives. There is no deity involved. The Church itself helps educate people about various body modification rites. In its Vision Statement, the Church says it hopes to one day practice its rituals without restriction in a world free of prejudice against it.

Members of other religions are welcomed into the Church of Body Modification. Since there is no physical location for the Church, home rituals are usually prevalent. There are monthly online classes for members. It does not gain new members from promotion, but solely through attraction to its ideals.

== Statement of faith ==
We will always respect our bodies.

We believe it is our right to explore our world, both physical and supernatural, through spiritual body modification.

We promise to always grow as individuals through body modification and what it can teach us about who we are and what we can do.

We vow to share our experiences openly and honestly in order to promote growth in mind, body, and soul.

We honor all forms of body modification and those who choose to practice in safe and consensual ways.

We also promise to respect those who do not choose body modification.

We support all that join us in our mission and help those seeking us in need of spiritual guidance.

We strive to share a positive message with everyone we encounter, in order to act as positive role models for future generations in the body modification community.

We always uphold basic codes of ethics and encourage others to do the same.

== Status in the Church ==
There are various levels of membership in the Church of Body Modification.

=== Board of advisors ===
A Board of Advisors runs the Church of Body Modification. The criteria for becoming a board member include expertise in body modification and a positive standing in the community. At the moment, there are currently three advisors: Cere Coichetti, Russ Foxx, and Jared Karnes. One of the former advisors, Rick Frueh, died in October 2017.

=== Ministers ===
Below those Board Members are Ministers, who function as spiritual guides. According to the Code of Ethics, "Spiritual guides are to practice and serve in ways that cultivate awareness, empathy, and wisdom."

== Legal cases ==
In 2001, a member of the Church of Body Modification was fired from a Costco because of an eyebrow ring. The employee sued Costco, claiming that wearing the eyebrow ring was a religious practice and thus protected under Title VII of the Civil Rights Act of 1964. The court ruled in Costco's favor, holding that it had reasonably accommodated her by offering to reinstate her if she covered or removed the piercing. On appeal, the 1st Circuit affirmed the ruling, adding that Costco had no duty to accommodate the employee because exempting her from the dress code would impose an undue hardship on Costco.

A 14-year-old member of the Church was suspended from Clayton High School in North Carolina, United States, because a nose stud was against the dress code. Her school principal said she could not find any reason why the religion required her to wear a nose ring. The ACLU took the matter to federal court on free speech grounds; a federal judge ruled in the student's favor October 8, 2010.
