= Shannon Larratt =

Canadian editor and publisher

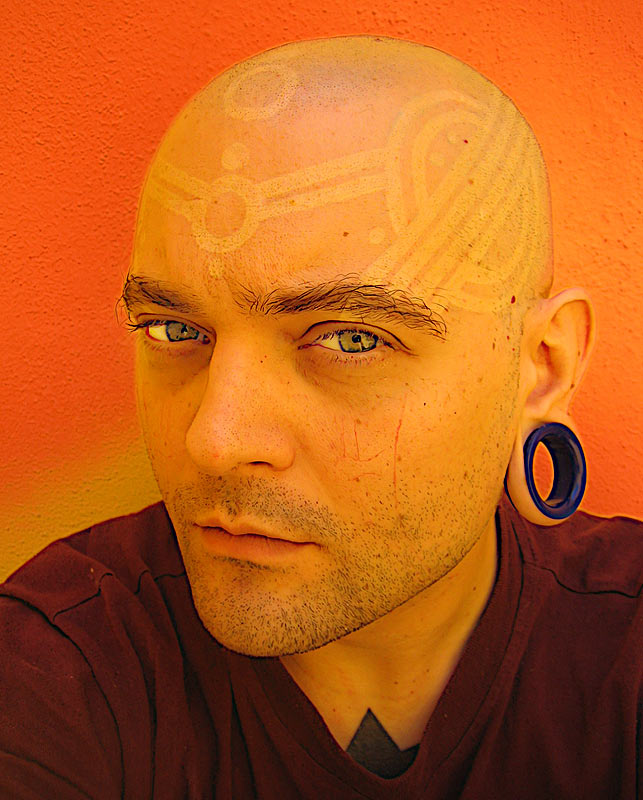
- Born: September 29, 1973; Victoria, British Columbia, Canada
- Died: March 15, 2013 (aged 39); Toronto, Ontario, Canada
- Occupations: Editor, publisher, writer
- Spouse: Rachel Larratt (divorced)
- Family: Devon Larratt (brother)

Shannon David Larratt (September 29, 1973 – March 15, 2013) was a Canadian writer and artist. Larratt was best known as the creator, editor, and publisher of BMEzine, an online magazine focusing on extreme body modifications. The author of multiple books, Larratt was also known for writing openly about his experiences with mental illness and drug abuse.

== Early life and education ==
Shannon David Larratt was born in Victoria, British Columbia, Canada on September 29, 1973. His brother is a professional armwrestler, Devon Larratt. Larratt wrote publicly about his father's mental illness causing danger to those around him, which would parallel his own later experiences with mental health. Larratt wrote in 2002 that his father faced restraining orders by multiple neighbors and family members.

In middle school Shannon produced a video titled SUCKMORD, which was largely a collage of his work and which centered on themes surrounding death. His high consumption of psychedelic drugs during this period was likely connected to his later psychiatric issues. In his final year of high school, he claimed to have been allowed to use LSD by a teacher, while creating an art project that incorporated his own blood.

Though Larratt claimed to have begun attending university on a full scholarship, he dropped out after the first year.

== Career ==
=== BMEzine ===
Larratt founded BMEzine in 1994. In 2002 he was the host of the first of several "BME Pain Olympics", viral videos showing various clips of cock and ball torture.

In September 2007, there were issues over the ownership of BMEzine. Larratt claimed to be locked out of BMEzine, IAM, and his personal blog, Zentastic.

In May 2008 Laratt posted on BME's blog that he would no longer be working at BMEzine, and that ownership of BMEzine would be transferred to his ex-wife, Rachel Larratt. In August 2012, he began writing for ModBlog once again.

== Personal life ==
=== Mental health ===
Having seen the consequences of his father's mental illness on the family, Larratt made finding coping mechanisms a priority. Following a nervous breakdown, he was diagnosed with schizophrenia, leading to him being institutionalized. The diagnosis would later be disputed by another doctor.

=== Death ===
In 2010, Larratt was diagnosed with tubular aggregate myopathy, a rare muscle disease. Larratt died in Toronto, Ontario, where he had been living, on March 15, 2013.

== In popular culture ==
- Shannon appeared in and written for magazines and newspapers around the world, including the front cover of the premiere issue of the British magazine, Bizarre, as well as BURST and BUBKA in Japan, VideoText Journal, WIRED, io9, Tattoo Savage, The Gargoyle, The Picture, Piercing Bible, Stuff, Fetish, Friday, GQ, Details, DS, Fashion Theory, CyberZone, Biba, Unity, Tatowier, Nyan2club, Skin&Ink, NetGuide, the Net, Playgirl, and others.
- Shannon appeared on several television and radio shows including TLC, Discovery Channel, Richler Ink, and more.
- Shannon appears in the intro to the Clerks II film (playing "Ear Guy"), along with his ex-wife Rachel.

== Bibliography ==
- I Am The Strength Of Art (1999; with portraits by Philip Barbosa)
- ModCon: The Secret World of Extreme Body Modification (2002; with portraits by Philip Barbosa)
- Opening Up: Body Modification Interviews 1995-2008 (2008)
- MEET TOMMY: An Exploration of Private Body Modification and Play (2012)
