= Pearling (body modification) =

Permanent insertion of beads under genital skin

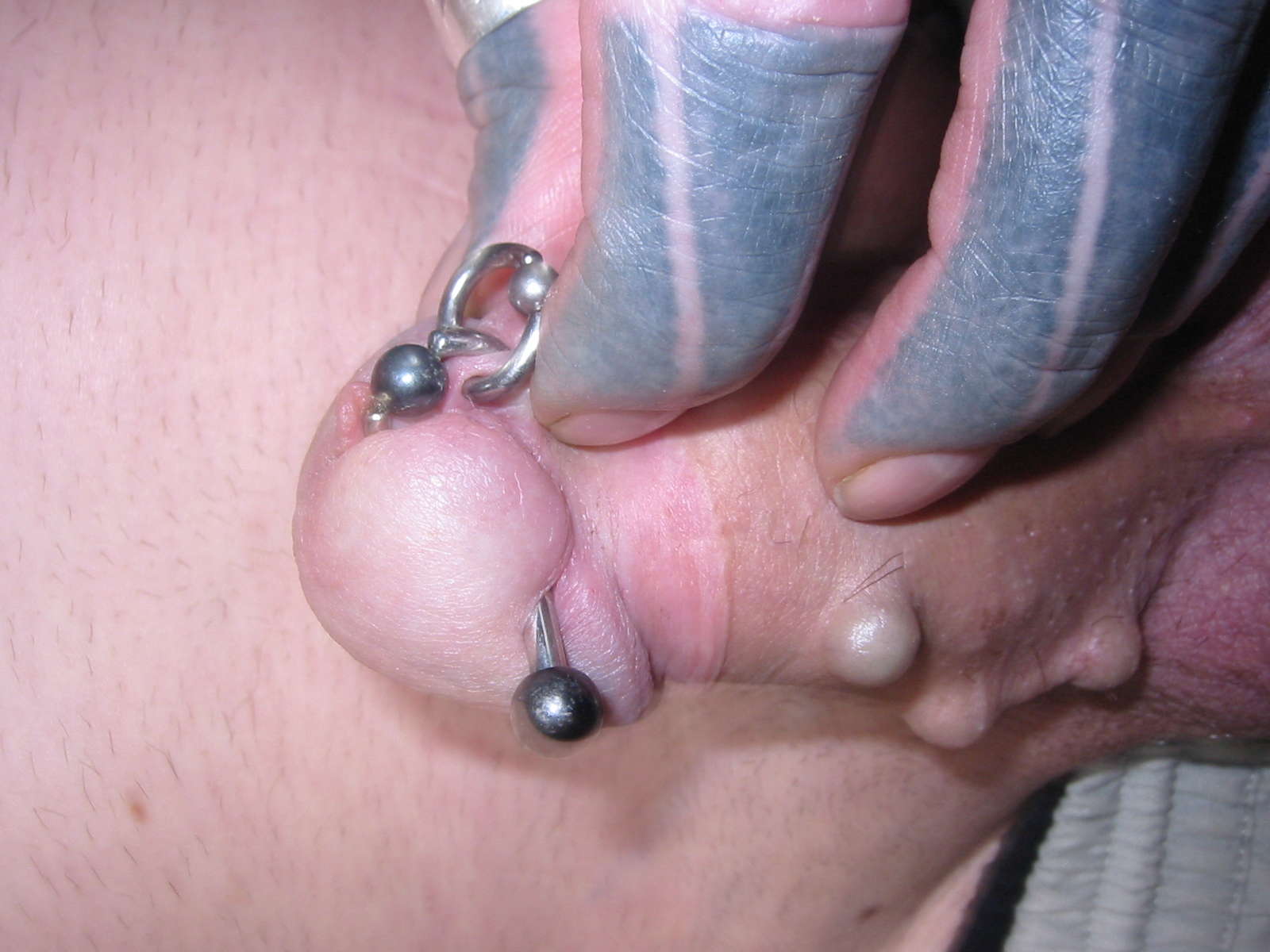
Pearling

Pearling or genital beading is a form of body modification, the practice of permanently inserting small beads made of various materials beneath the skin of the genitals—of the labia, or of the shaft or foreskin of the penis. As well as being an aesthetic practice, this is usually intended to enhance the sexual pleasure of partners during vaginal or anal intercourse.

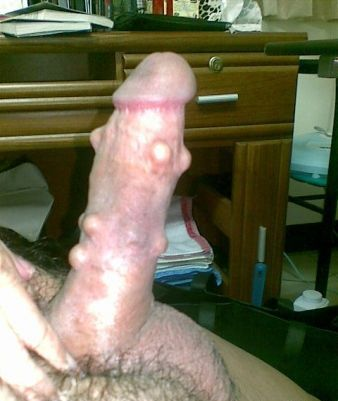
Pearling

== Procedures ==
There are two common procedures, one being very similar to a frenum piercing and the other being similar to inserting a subdermal implant, and requiring more medical knowledge and specialized tools. Either procedure is relatively safe with risks and healing much like a subdermal implant in any other part of the body, although, like many genital piercings, the generous blood flow to the genitals can reduce healing times considerably. Inflammation is very common, during and after healing, although careful healing can minimize this. Rejection is rare, but can occur.

== Jewelry ==
A wide variety of inert implant materials can be used for this implant. Teflon, silicone, surgical steel or titanium are commonly used materials. Prior to the availability of modern materials, there is a long history of pearls being used in this implant, hence the name pearling. There is an alternative form of this implant, where short curved "ribs" are inserted, rather than pearls.

== History and culture ==
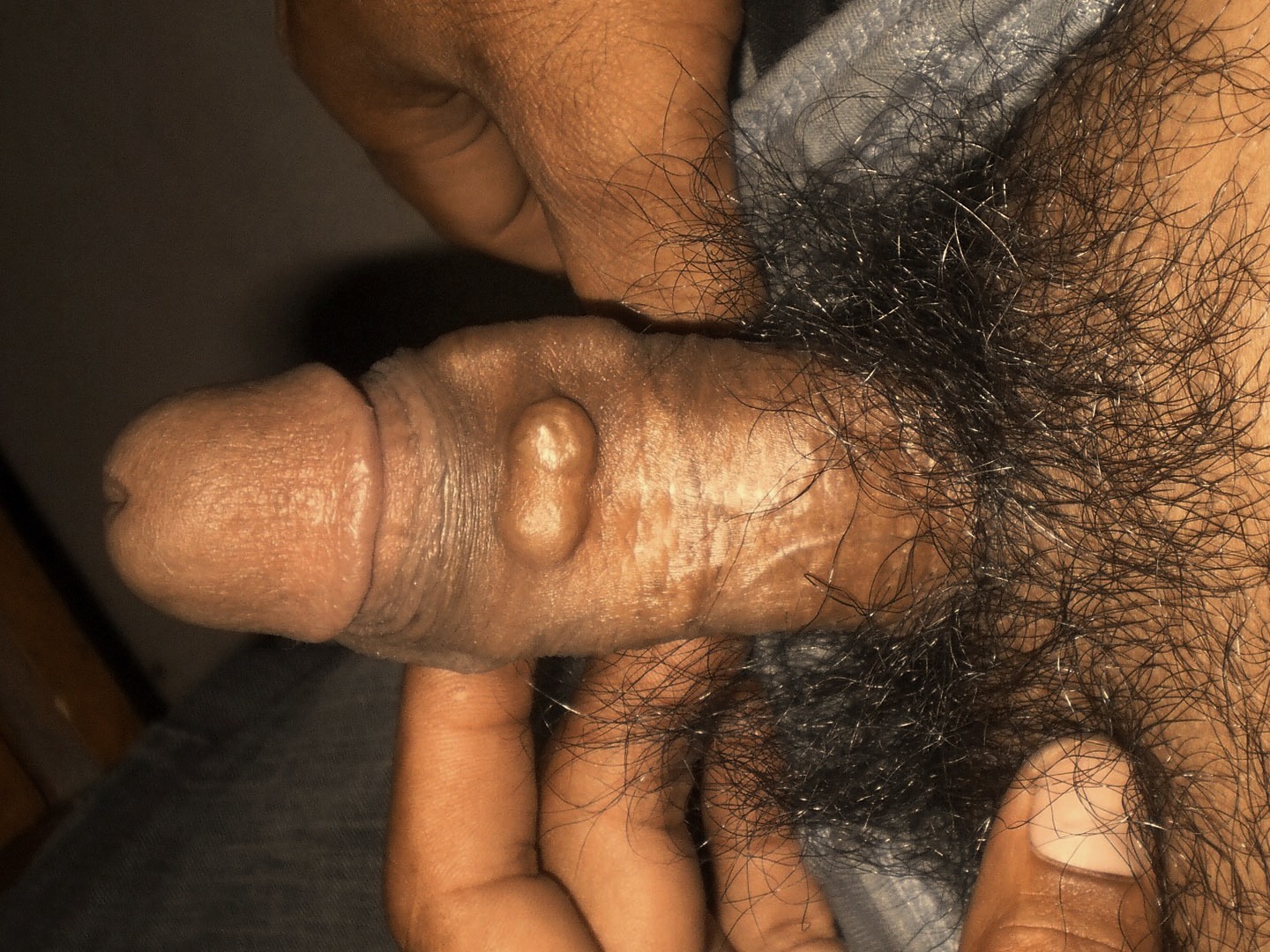
Penis of a Filipino man with beads under penile skin.

The precise origin of pearling is unknown, but early documentation in China indicates that it had been imported from Southeast Asia no later than the early 1400s. Historical documents refer to the inserts as miǎnlíng (Chinese: 缅玲), literally translating to Burmese bells. In the Philippines, researchers have established that these were present in various forms from the Visayas to southern Luzon. In the Visayas, pins made of gold, ivory, or brass were inserted in young boys through their penis heads, according to research by the pre-eminent historian of pre-colonial Philippines, William Henry Scott. As the boys grew older, these pins would be decorated and they would later fasten bluntly spiked rings for the stimulation of their sex partners. In Barangay, his study of 16th century Philippine ethnography, Scott wrote, "these ornaments required manipulation by the woman herself to insert and could not be withdrawn until the male organ was completely relaxed." Scott added that there were as many as 30 different kinds to "cater to a lady's choice."

The best-known historical use of pearling involves the yakuza organized crime syndicates of Japan, whose members perform several notable types of body modification, including large body irezumi tattoos and Yubitsume, the amputation of finger joints in penance to their superiors. Pearling is performed in prison by the yakuza, with each pearl supposedly symbolizing a year spent in prison.

Pearling, called 'bolitas', has become a common practice among Filipino sailors, especially among the older ones. Journalist Ryan Jacobs, writing in The Atlantic, reported in 2013 that sailors use bolitas to differentiate themselves from other international sailors, especially to curry favor from prostitutes.

The practice comes from Pre-colonial period in the Philippines wherein instruments such as the Tudruck (Penis-pin) and Sakra (Penis-ring), often made up of gold or ivory, were inserted to the penises of young adults. Antonio Pigafetta, Italian chronicler of Ferdinand Magellan's circumnavigation, once wrote about this practice in his journals:

Both young and old males pierce their penises with a gold or tin rod the size of a goose quill. In both ends of the same bolt, some have what resembles a spur, with points upon the ends; others are like the head of a cart nail. I very often asked many, both young and old, to see their penis, because I could not credit it. In the middle of the bolt is a hole, through which they urinate. The bolt and the spurs always hold firm. They say that the women wish it so, and if they did otherwise they would not have communication with them. When a man wishes to have intercourse with a woman, she takes his penis not in the normal way, but gently introduces first the top spur and then the bottom one into her vagina. Once inside, the penis becomes erect and cannot be withdrawn until it is limp.

— Antonio Pigafetta
