= Stretching (body piercing) =

Type of body piercings

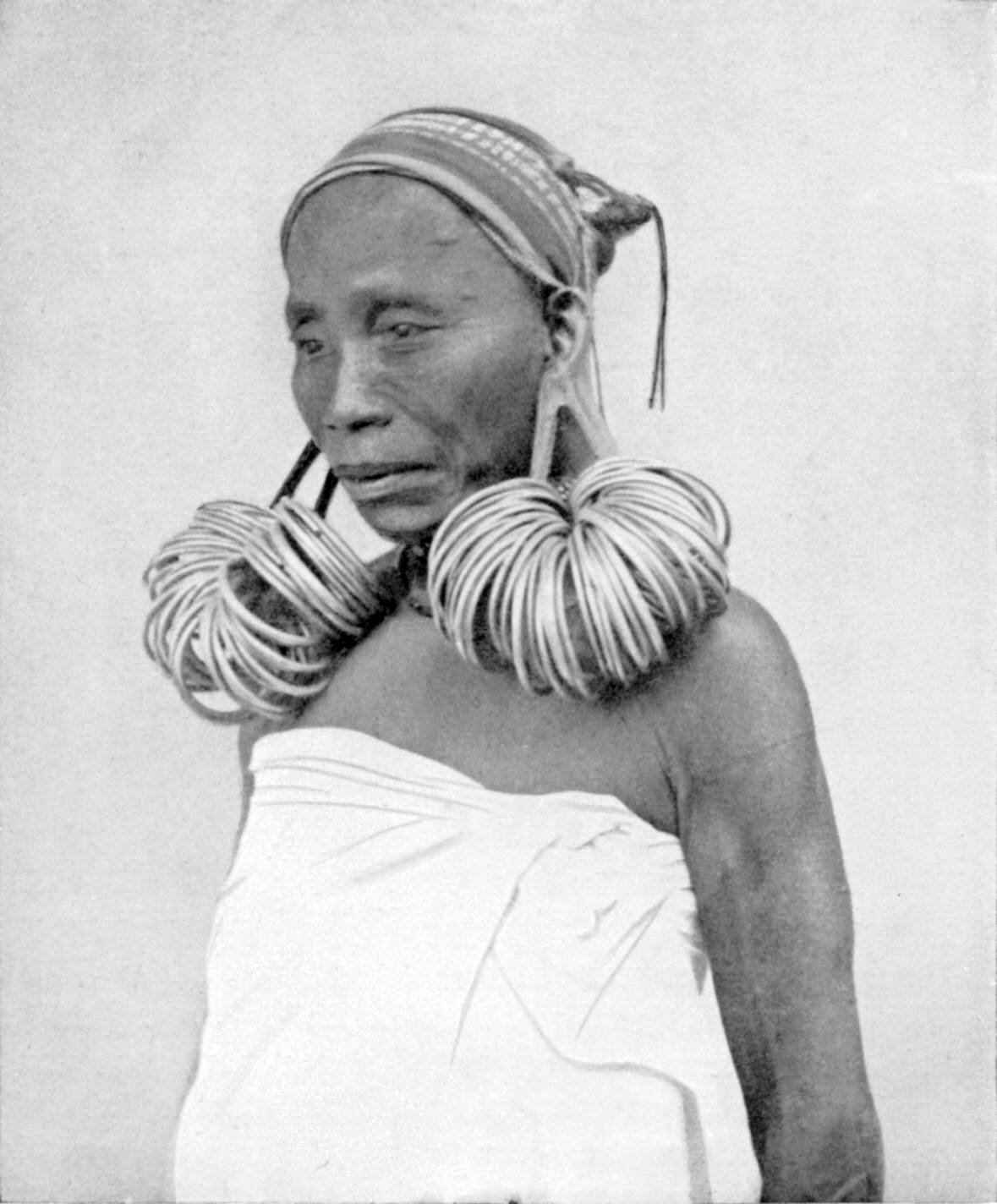
A Garo woman with stretched ears

Stretching, in the context of body piercing, is the deliberate expansion of a healed piercing for the purpose of wearing certain types of body piercing jewelry. Ear piercings are the most commonly stretched piercings, with nasal septum piercings, tongue piercings and lip piercings/lip plates following close behind. While all piercings can be stretched to some degree, cartilage piercings are usually more difficult to stretch and more likely to form hypertrophic scars if stretched quickly. Dermal punching is generally the preferred method for accommodating larger jewelry in cartilage piercings.

Stretching is usually done in small increments to minimize the potential for damaging the healed fistula or creating scar tissue. In North America, the American wire gauge system is used, and most stretching methods go up by a single even-sized gauge increment at a time. 0g (8 mm), is generally considered to be "the point of no return": a hole larger than this size will rarely close to a standard piercing size. Since each body is different, any stretched piercings, no matter the size, should be approached as a permanent body modification. In Europe and most of the rest of the world, body jewelry sizes are measured in metric, but the increments between standard sizes are similar.

There are indications of ear-stretching in early human history, including the gold mask of Tutankhamun in Ancient Egypt and the body of Ötzi the Iceman, a European mummy from the Chalcolithic period.

== Health concerns ==
Health complications with stretching, when done safely, are rare. Over-stretching or up-sizing too rapidly may cause a "blowout" where the inside of the fistula is pushed out of the piercing, requiring immediate care and potentially causing permanent scarring or complications with future stretching or down-sizing. A stretched piercing may shrink when left without jewelry, and techniques such as massage may improve results, however the amount varies by the individual and all stretches should be considered permanent body modifications. The only way to entirely close a stretched fistula is an earlobe repair surgery

== Jewelry for stretched piercings ==
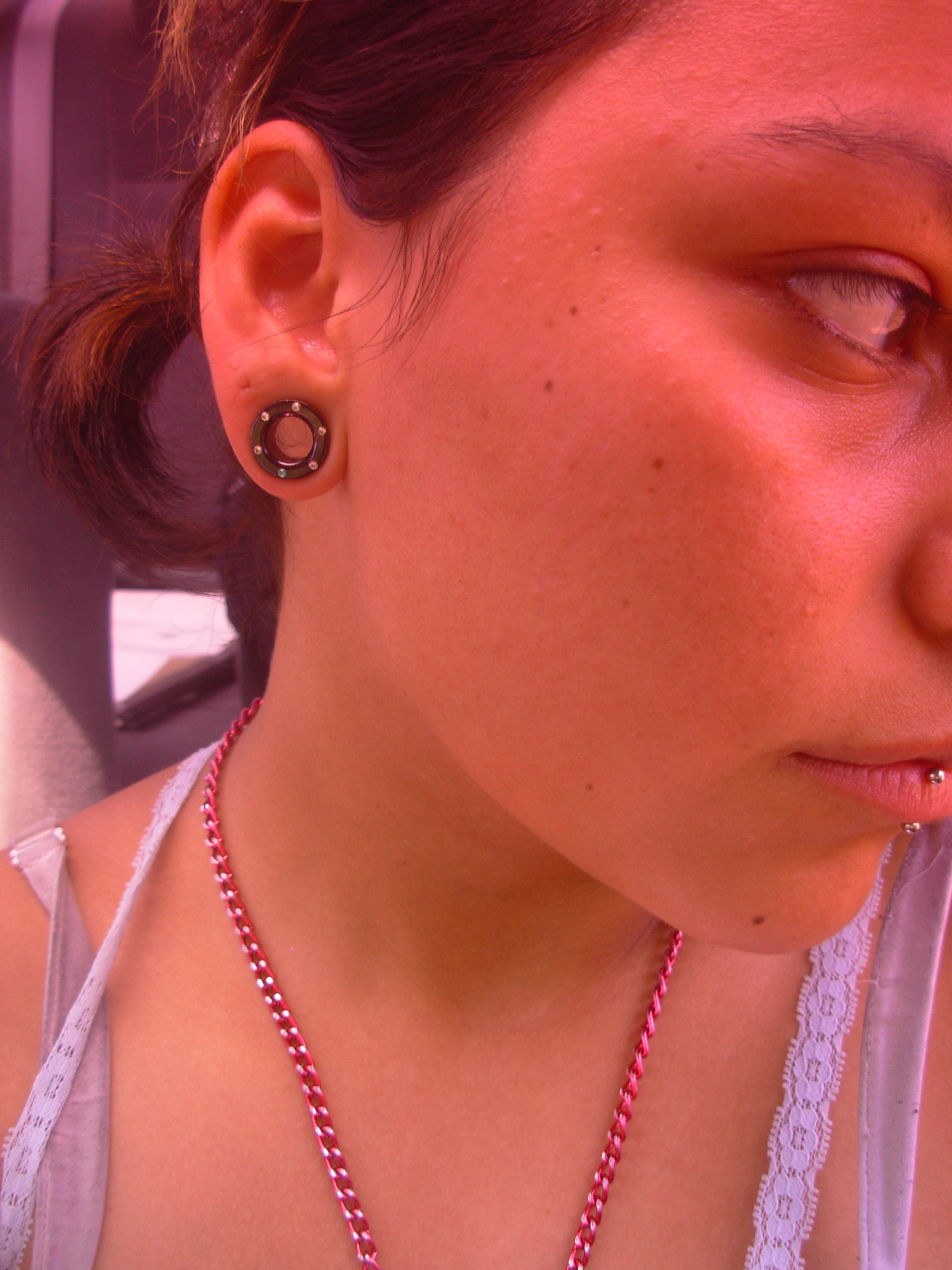
Flesh tunnel (metal)

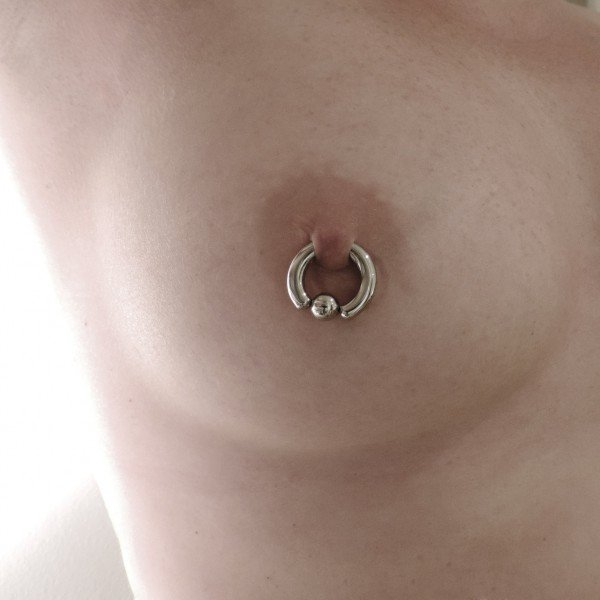
Stretched nipple piercing with larger gauge ball closure ring

There is a large variety of jewelry available for stretched piercings. Many jewelry materials can be used in the manufacturing of jewelry for stretched piercings; materials that would ordinarily be too delicate or brittle to be inserted in smaller-gauge piercings are freely used. Stone, fossilized materials, wood, bone, horn, amber, bamboo, silicone, and glass are not uncommon in stretched piercings. Some of these materials "breathe" better than metals or plastics, preventing the buildup of sebum in the enlarged ear lobe. Jewelry, however, is still often made of acrylic or metal. There are dangers associated with wearing porous materials such as acrylic, stone, wood, bamboo, horn, bone, or other materials with small or microscopic holes, in a freshly stretched piercing. These materials not only have microscopic holes that will trap bacteria and can cause infection, but also cannot be autoclaved or properly sanitized, and are therefore unfit for a fresh stretch or piercing. The best materials for a fresh stretch that are not vulnerable to bacteria are implant grade steel, titanium, and glass. This is because these materials are non-porous and can withstand the heat and pressure of an autoclave, so that they can be properly sanitized before insertion.

The typical jewelry worn in a large stretched piercing is a plug, sometimes incorrectly referred to as a "gauge" or "gauges", which refers to the sizing system used in the U.S. It is solid and usually cylindrical, and may be flared out at one or both ends (saddle-shaped), or kept in place by o-rings fastened around the ends. A variation on this is the flesh tunnel, which is shaped in the same way, but hollow in the middle. Claw-, talon-, and spiral-shaped pieces are also commonplace. Ear-weights in varying degrees of size are also worn, commonly made from silver or bronze, though other metals such as copper or brass are occasionally used. However, some people are easily irritated by some metals; therefore, care should be taken when metal jewelry is worn. Ear cuffs (such as the gold ones utilized in South India provinces) or wrapped bead work (common amongst the Maasai of East Africa) are other options, though are not usually seen in modern Western contexts.

== Techniques ==
There are several common methods used to enlarge piercings, of various origins and appropriate for different circumstances.

=== Dead stretching ===
Dead stretching is the process of inserting a larger piece of jewelry into an existing piercing without any other equipment. Dead stretching is recommended as the safest method of piercing stretching, however, dead stretching can lead to injury if the fistula is unready: either a tear of the skin, or a "blowout", in which the fistula is pushed out through the back of the piercing. Some piercings will stretch slightly on their own and larger jewelry can be inserted without the potential for unpleasant side effects, especially piercings that see a lot of "play", such as tongue piercings. Self stretching can be induced in other piercings by massaging the tissue, playing with the jewelry, and tugging it in small circles. Dead stretching is very safe if the lubricated jewelry slides easily into the piercing. The jewelry should never be forced in place.

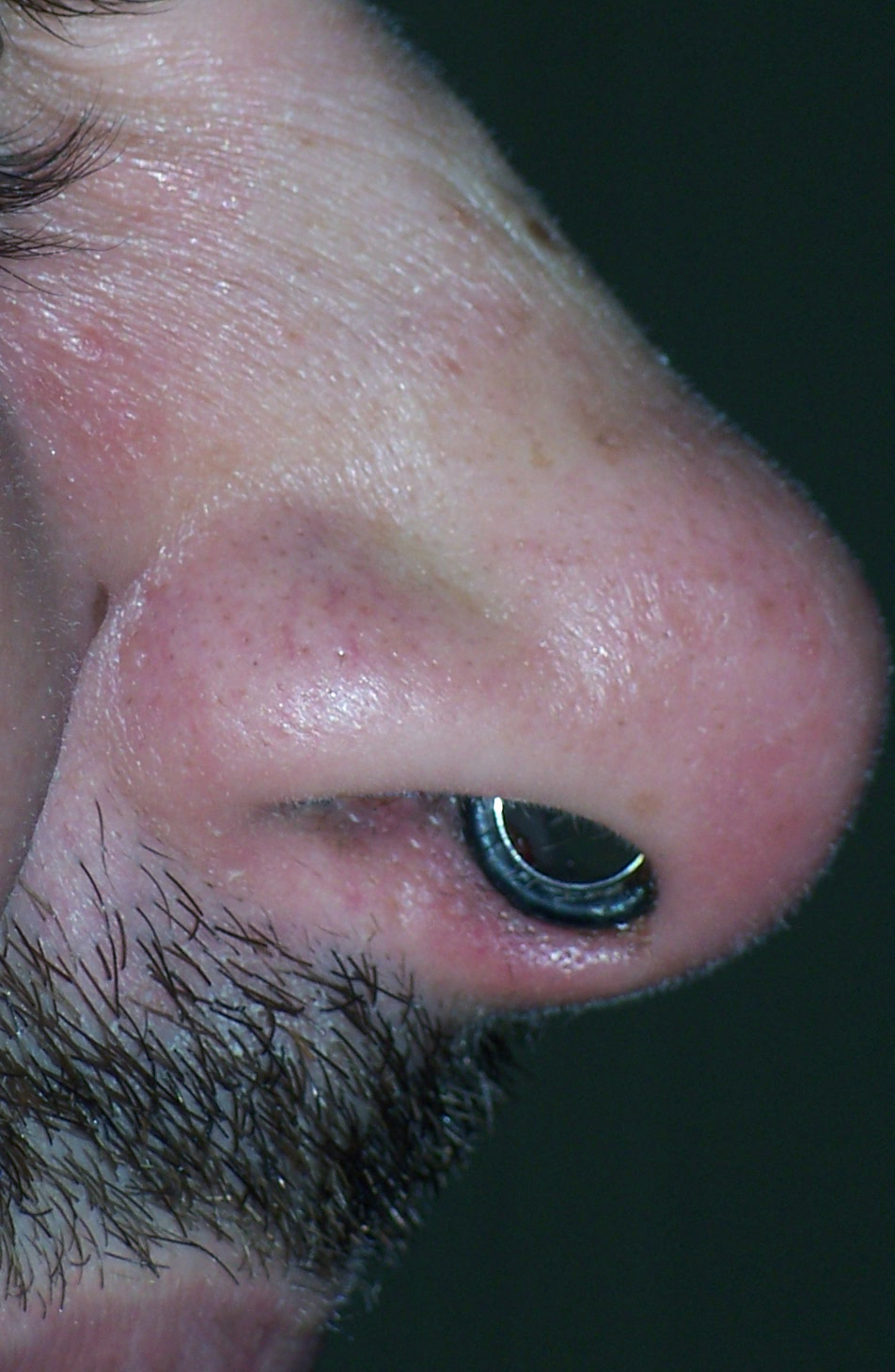
A septum piercing stretched to 0 ga by a combination of dead stretching and tapering

=== Tapering ===
Tapering involves the use of a taper, a conical rod usually made specifically for this purpose. It is lubricated and pushed through the fistula until the widest part of the taper is level with the skin surrounding the piercing. Larger jewelry is then pushed through, parallel to the back of the taper. Tapers come in a variety of sizes and are usually identified by the gauge of the large end. They can vary in length, but most tapers are about 2–3 inches (5.1–7.6 cm) long. Most tapers are made of stainless steel or acrylic and some have threads extending from the wide end to allow the attachment of barbell jewelry, to make insertion easier. Improvised objects like knitting needles and porcupine quills or cocktail sticks are sometimes used as tapers by people stretching at home; however, this is not recommended by professionals, as their gauge cannot be exactly determined and sterile practices are rarely followed at home. Tapering is discouraged at sizes above 2g (6.5 millimeters (0.26 in)). The use of a taper makes it easier to stretch a piercing before it is ready, which can lead to tearing the fistula, pain, bleeding, swelling, blowouts, and scar tissue.

=== Taping ===
The existing jewelry is removed and a thin layer of non-adhesive Teflon tape (PTFE tape), which is inert and safe for piercing use, is wrapped around the jewelry. Non-adhesive bondage tape and heat-shrink tubing are also frequently used. The jewelry is then re-inserted, and as the piercing adapts to the new diameter of jewelry, the process is repeated with increasingly thicker layers of tape.

=== Weighting ===
Large, heavy jewelry or weighted objects can be used to stretch piercings. This method is not widely used in modern-day, as it tends to cause piercings to migrate and can, especially in ears, lead to a thinning of tissue that is disfiguring or requires reconstructive surgery. However, it is a method that has been traditionally utilized by various tribes, such as the Dayaks in Borneo, that practice extreme earlobe elongation.

=== Scalpeling ===
Rather than expanding a healed fistula, this method involves extending the size of the piercing by using a scalpel to cut the edge of the fistula, expanding its diameter. It is often used in earlobe piercings. This technique is also often used to alter the placement of a large piercing, combine two existing piercings into one larger one, or achieve a higher-gauge piercing when scar tissue is preventing stretching, or when tissue has thinned too much making stretching too risky.

=== Scalpel or pierce and taper ===
After piercing or scalpelling, a large taper can be inserted directly after, allowing skin to instantly be stretched to large diameters; several inches can be achieved. This method is much rarer and can be extremely painful, causing formation of large amounts of scar tissue. Because of this, it is generally discouraged. The use of a dermal punch followed by tapering is also used in this procedure.

=== Dermal Punching ===
A circular razor of the desired diameter is pressed against the skin of the area (typically earlobe or cartilage). The blade is then pushed down upon and twisted by the piercer to "punch" out a small disk of skin. The razor is then pulled out of the skin and the jewelry (usually a non-flared or single-flared Pyrex Glass plug) of the same size is inserted into the hole created by the razor. This is useful for achieving large-gauge cartilage piercings, and often discouraged for soft tissue that can easily be stretched. It is also described as being less painful and less damaging to tissue than using a hypodermic needle of the same gauge.

=== Silicone plugs ===
These plugs are soft and malleable, allowing a relatively large plug to be inserted into the fistula. Once folded and inserted into the ear, they expand, stretching the earlobe. However, stretching with silicone is often a dangerous decision. It is not recommended to use silicone plugs to stretch, due to the tacky, porous surface. The stretched fistula can adhere to the silicone if the lubricant used is pushed out by the pressure of the stretch, and an airtight seal can be created, trapping infection and causing it to spread internally. Furthermore, because silicone expands and contracts following changes in temperature, they can swell and potentially blow out a newly stretched fistula.

== History and culture ==
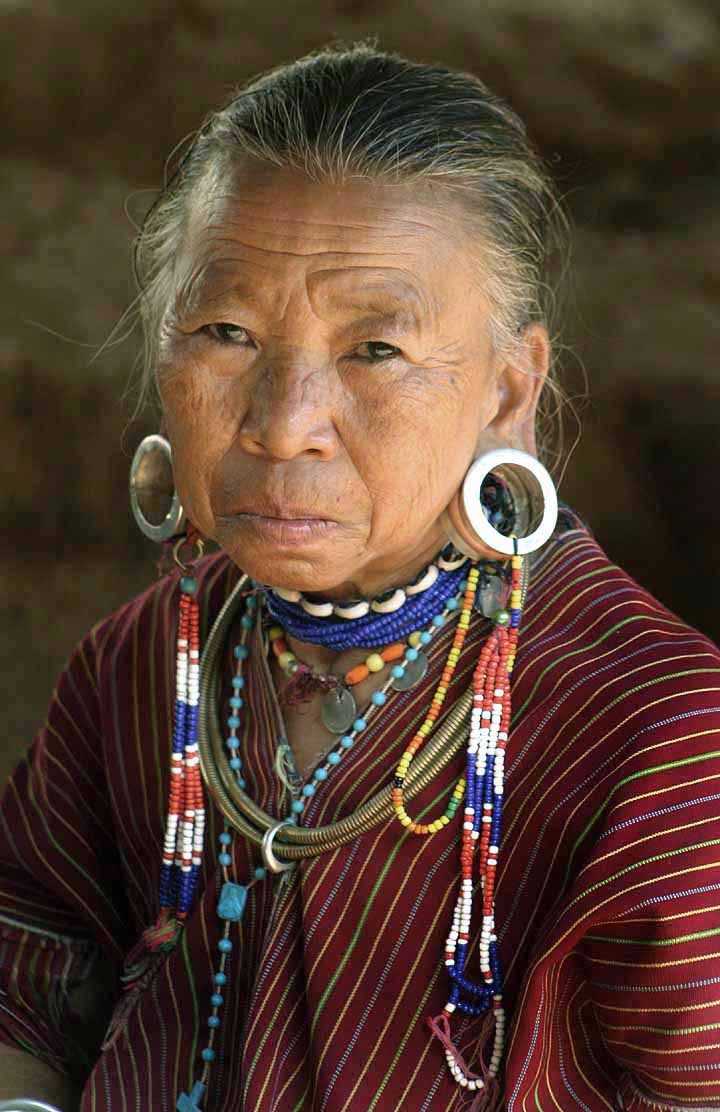
Karen woman with stretched earlobes

Many young, western people have adopted the practice of stretching ear lobes for aesthetic reasons. This seems to give the impression that this is a modern practice, however, it is not. Ear stretching is a ritual that has been practiced by people all over the world from ancient times. Bone, horn, wood, and stone are generally carved for ear stretching, but other organic materials that have the right shape naturally, such as shells, teeth, and claws, have also been used.

Historically, the practice has been used for the purpose of achieving social status, to scare enemies in war, and for aesthetic purposes. It has been and still is a common practice for people in many parts of the world, including Africa, Eurasia, America, and beyond.

=== Ancient Egypt ===
The Ancient Egyptian collection in the British Museum contains very large, thick earrings that would have required continuous stretching to make large permanent holes. Mummies have been found with their earlobes stretched to fit ear plugs of more than 6 centimetres (2.4 in) in diameter. The earlobes of the gold mask of Tutankhamun include large holes that appear to have been created by stretching. The pharaoh owned many large ornate pairs of earrings, but after the examination of his mummy no mention was made as to whether his ears were pierced or not.

=== The Iceman ===
Mummified bodies with stretched earlobes have been discovered, including the oldest mummified body discovered to date: Ötzi the Iceman (3300BC). The Iceman was found in the Alps between Austria and Italy. This European mummy had a stretch of somewhere between 7–11 millimeters (0.28–0.43 in) in diameter.

=== Gautama Buddha ===
Gautama Buddha is usually depicted with long stretched ears. As an aristocratic and wealthy prince, he would have worn heavy gold earrings or precious stones as a status symbol, and the weight would have stretched his ear lobes dramatically. When he finally renounced his wealth and discarded his jewelry, his ear lobes would have been permanently stretched. As a way of remembering Buddha's act of walking away from his wealth (and his wife), most images of Gautama Buddha show his stretched ear lobes without jewellery.

=== Easter Island heads ===
Stretched earlobes can be found on the heads of the giant statues (moai) on Easter Island, giving them the title 'Long Ears.' It is said that the original inhabitants of Easter Island carved the heads to depict themselves. When another tribe arrived to the Island, they were given the title 'Short Ears.' The 'Long Ears' would enslave the 'Short Ears' until there were more 'Short Ears' to overthrow them.

=== Mursi women in Ethiopia ===
The Mursi are a Nilotic people inhabiting the Nile Valley, known for their women decorating themselves with wooden plates in both their ears and bottom lip. Around the age of fifteen and a year before her marriage, a young woman has her lip and ears pierced by her mother. She then pushes a wooden peg through each piercing. After the healing process, the pegs are changed and go up in diameter (usually 8–22 cm). Once the desired size is reached, the young woman receives a higher degree of respect than those without piercings.

=== The Maasai people of Kenya ===
Both Maasai men and women stretch their ears, although today more women than men follow the practice. Originally, the piercing was done with a sharpened object such as the point of a knife or a thorn. Heavy jewelry was then placed in the hole to increase the size. The Maasai are known for using materials such as animal bones, wood, stone, and tusks for jewelry.

=== The Fulani of western Africa ===
The Fulani people are from Nigeria and elsewhere in western Africa. At the age of three years, girls will have their ears pierced but not stretched until they are older. These women will stretch their ears to a smaller diameter, unlike the Mursi and Maasai tribes, so that they can wear hoops and large gold domes.

=== Asian hill tribes ===
The Lahu tribe from Thailand and the Karen-Padaung from Myanmar are two known Asian tribes that practice ear stretching. They both believe that they should wear as much jewelry as possible because ears are revered as sacred.

=== Indigenous peoples of the Americas ===
Aztec and Maya men are traditionally known to have had stretched ears. The Aztecs crafted plugs from gold and silver for the higher-class men whereas the lower class wore materials such as shells, wood, and copper. The same idea can be seen with the Mayas. High-class men wore jade plugs, and the rest of society used bone, stone, and wood. Another example of this occurs in the Moche culture of Northern Peru, who used similar techniques and jewelry to stretch their earlobes as a symbol of status and strength.

Taíno men and women of the Greater Antilles were recorded by explorer Christopher Columbus as having stretched ears.
