= Transdermal implant =

Type of implant

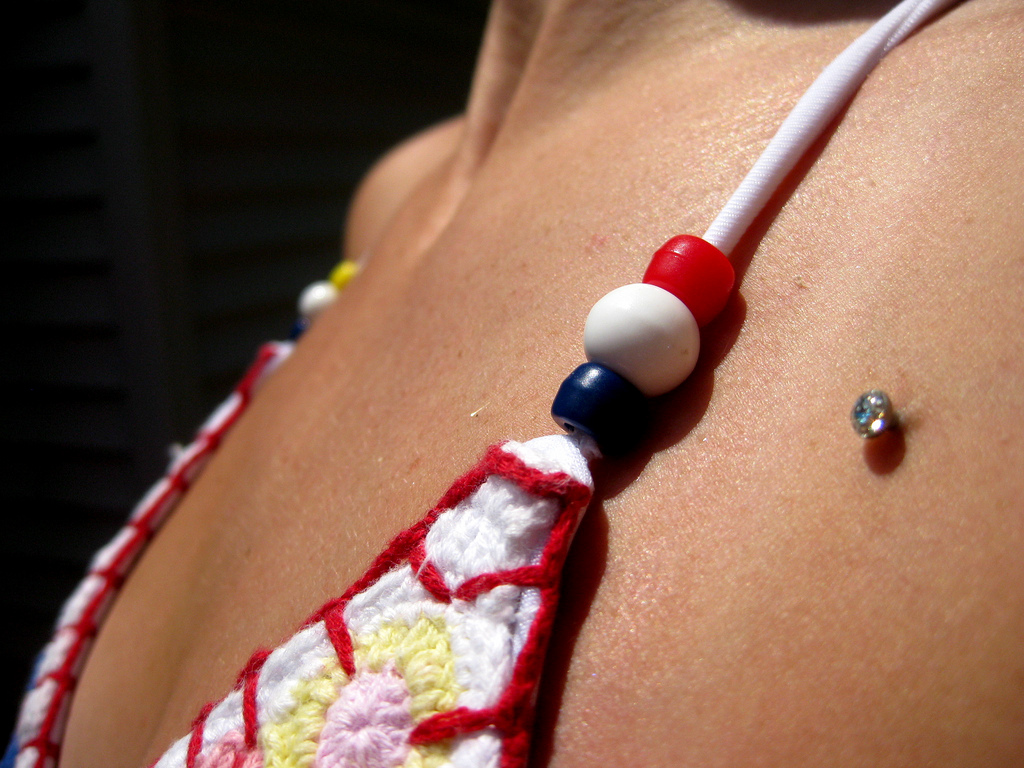
Transdermal implant

Transdermal implants, or dermal piercings, are a form of body modification used both in a medical and aesthetic context that, in contrast to subdermal implants, consist of an object placed partially below and partially above the skin, thus implanted transdermal. Two techniques are prevalent using post-like and microdermal implants respectively.

Although the skin around such implants generally heals as if it were a piercing, in the body piercing community, these types of modification are commonly called fairly "heavy" due to the complexity of the procedure and potential social implications.

== Procedure ==
When the procedure is done using a post-like implant, an incision is made a small distance from the site. The skin is then lifted and the implant is passed through. Then, a hole is opened at the site for it to pass through, and it is moved so that the top part fills the hole. The implants used for this are generally small and not textured in any way except rounding.

If a more graphic implant is desired, it is generally done in two parts. First, the base is inserted the same way a single-part would be, except that the base implant is threaded. It may either stick out like a bolt, or be inward like a nut. When this is done, the top half is screwed on. This type is usually done for spikes and/or horns.

In any case, the part of the implant which passes under the skin generally is somewhat large and has holes. The skin will grow into them, making it more permanent.

== Microdermal implants ==
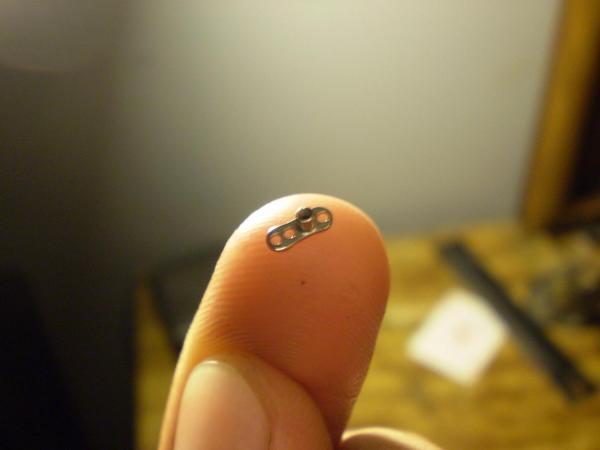
A microdermal prior to implantation

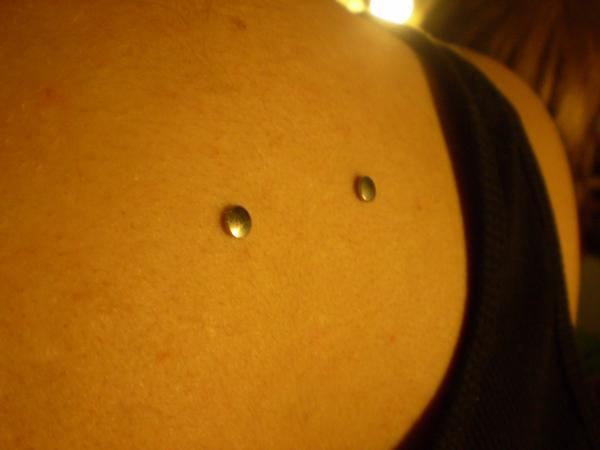
Healed microdermal implants

Microdermal implants are a form of body modification which gives the aesthetic appearance of a transdermal implant, without the complications of the much more complicated surgery associated with transdermal implants. Microdermals are single point piercings which are a sort of surface piercing.

Microdermal implants can be placed practically anywhere on the surface of the skin on the body, but are different from conventional piercings in that they are composed of two components: an anchor, which is implanted underneath the skin, with a step protruding from (or flush with) the surface of the surrounding skin, and the changeable jewellery, which is screwed into the threaded hole in the step of the anchor.

They should not be implanted in hands, feet, wrists, collarbones or any area where it is not flat or that is near a joint.

=== Procedure ===
The procedure is usually performed using a dermal punch or needle. When a dermal piercing is done with a punch, the pouch is made in a different way. When using a needle, the pouch is made by separating the skin. When using a dermal punch, the pouch is made by removing a bit of tissue. A microdermal punch is less painful and therefore commonly used. The process starts by identifying the point of piercing on the sterilized area that will be marked with a surgical marker. The microdermal punch is then used to remove skin tissues. The anchor is then placed under the skin and a piece of jewelry is placed using surgical forceps.

== See also ==
- Body modification
- Body piercing
- Body piercing materials
- Subdermal implant
