= Subdermal implant =

Body modification type

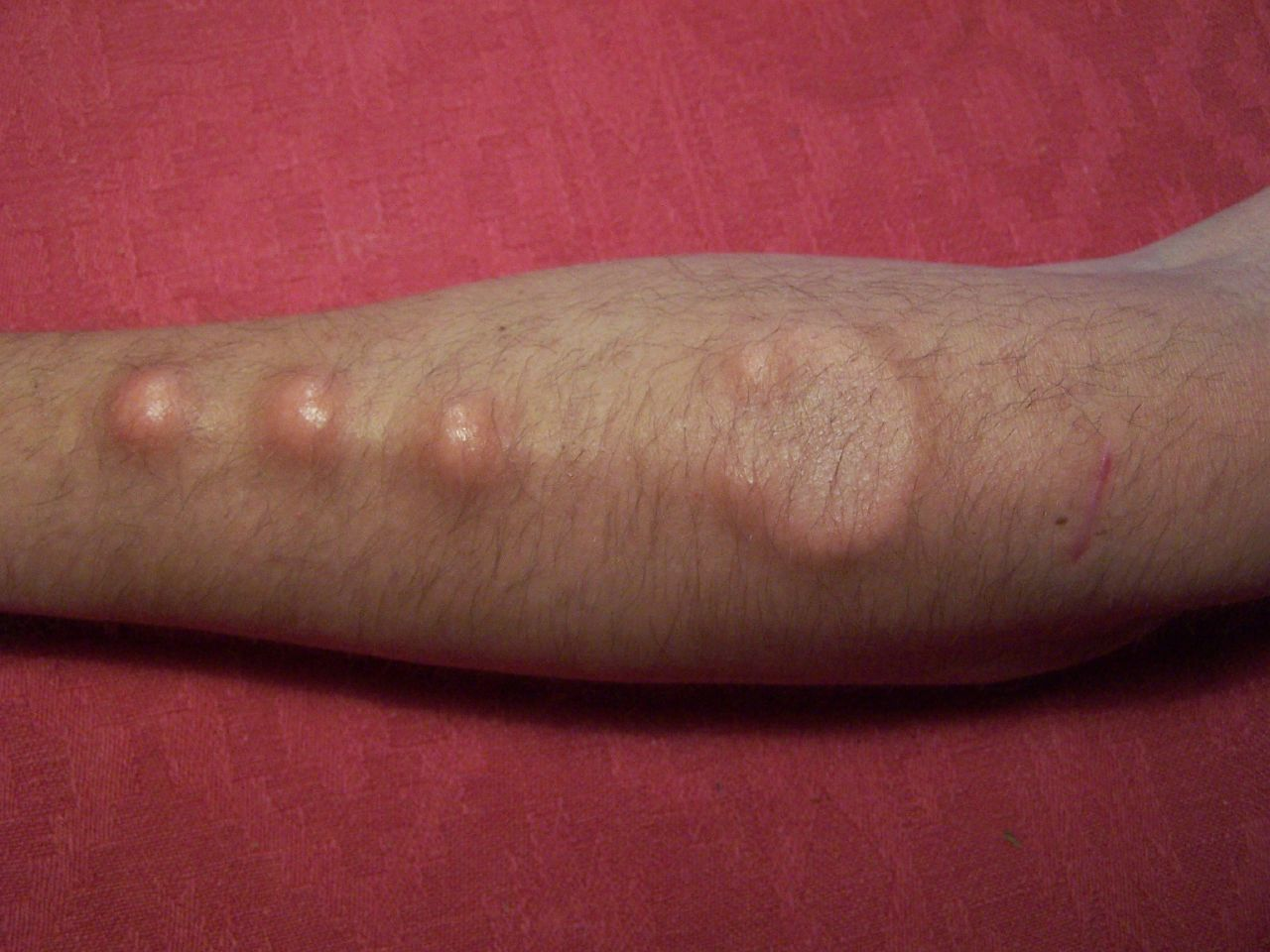
Cosmetic subdermal implants on the lower arm

A subdermal implant is a body modification placed under the skin, allowing the body to heal over the implant and creating a raised design. Such implants fall under the broad category of body modification. Many subdermal implants are made out of silicone, either carved or mold injected. Many people who have subdermal implants use them in conjunction with other types of body modification to create a desired, dramatic effect. This process is also known as a 3-D implant, or pocketing.

== History ==
The first subdermal implant was implanted in 1994. It is generally agreed upon that they were pioneered by Steve Haworth. In his shop, HTC Body Piercing, in Phoenix, Arizona, he first began these procedures after being asked for a bracelet. He concluded that he could put a row of beads under the woman's wrist to create the effect she desired. This was followed in 1998 by the scientist Kevin Warwick who experimented with both an RFID and an electrode array implant. Since then, many different artists have done many kinds of implants. Some of the well-known names in the industry include Samppa Von Cyborg, Max Yampolskiy, Brian Decker, Emilio Gonzales and Stelarc, who had a cell-cultivated ear implanted on his arm.

== Types ==
According to the Church of Body Modification, there are two main types of subdermal implants: subdermal (or subcutaneous) implants and transdermal implants. Magnetic subdermal implants also exist.

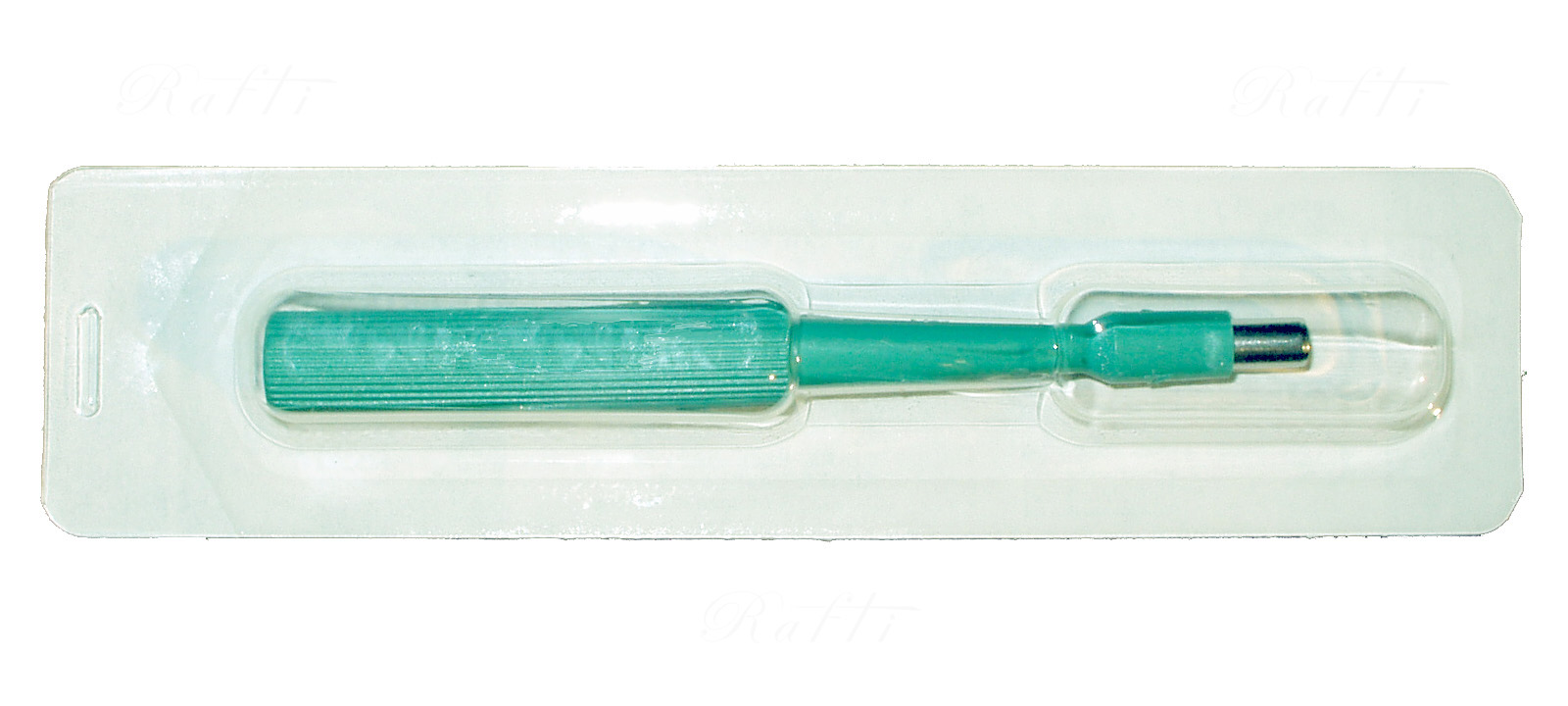
A dermal punch, used for transdermal implants, creates a large initial hole by removing a disk of skin.

=== Subdermal ===
Subdermal implants are completely buried in the dermis. These are used for both cosmetic and medical purposes, such as the contraceptive Norplant, consisting of six levonorgestrel-releasing Silastic capsules, and is placed under the skin of the upper arm, generally a woman’s arm. The cosmetic variant can be molded into any shape desired; though usually made of silicone. However, Teflon variants exist as well.

=== Transdermal ===
Transdermal implants are placed partially under the skin, with the rest exposed. This is done through a process known as "dermal punching". First the implant is placed in between the layers of skin. It is necessary for the part of the implant that will be located under the skin to have a proper shape. This must be one with holes in it (like a figure eight) so that the body will be able to grow around it. Once the implant is placed, the part that will protrude out is exposed using a dermal punch.

== Procedure ==
To have one of these implants installed, an incision is made down to the subcutaneous layer (subcutis) of the skin. A dermal elevator, a widely used medical instrument, separates the subcutis and the fascia, creating the pocket in which the implant will be inserted. After the implant is placed, the incision is stitched shut. Surgical tape is often applied to minimize movement while the skin fuses around the implant.

== Applications ==
=== Electronic implants ===
For electronic implants see microchip implant.

=== Cosmetic implants ===
Cosmetic Implants range from small subdermal silicone implants to form desired shapes and forms, ranging to LED light implants that emit light from under the skin.

=== Genital implants ===
Subdermal implants placed under the skin of the penis can provide physical stimulation for both sexual partners. The most frequent form is genital beading, using small, round implants. Short, curved rods are also used, and are called "genital ribs".

=== Braille tattoo ===
Klara Jirkova, a student at the Berlin University of the Arts, raised the possibility of using subdermal implants to create "Braille tattoos" readable by the blind. She proposes that small implants could be grouped to form braille characters, which she says "can be read by touch – stroke by blind people." She suggests that, if located near the thumb where they could be read during a handshake, "Braille tattoos" could help the blind recognize whom they are greeting. She states that this will be a more meaningful form of body modification as it relates to the sense of touch instead of sight.

== Health risks ==
Subdermal implants, being similar to plastic surgery, have more risks than other kinds of body modification. Any time that the human body is opened, it must be performed in a sterile environment, in order to prevent infection. This has become a major source of controversy regarding subdermal implants. Dr. Phil Haeck states, "This is a deviation in surgery that has no place for someone that has taken the Hippocratic Oath and wants to serve mankind."

== See also ==
- Body modification
- Body piercing materials
- Kevin Warwick
- The Lizardman
- The Enigma
- Body hacking
- Microchip implant (human)
- Cybernetics
