= Body modification =

Consensual alteration of human anatomy

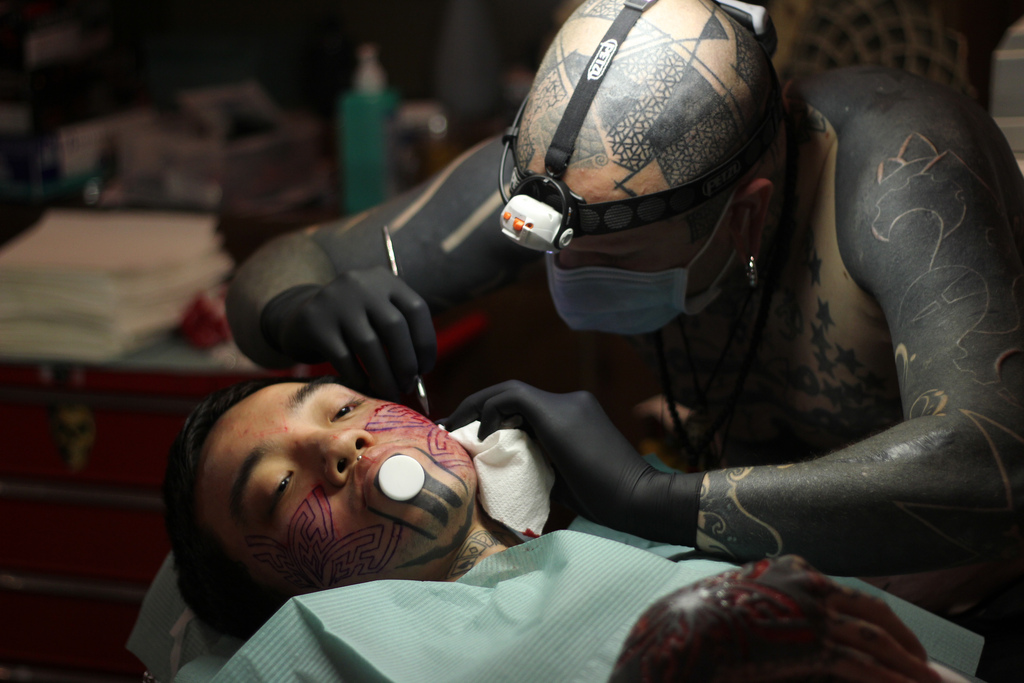
Scarification in progress

Body modification (or body alteration) is the deliberate altering of the human anatomy or human physical appearance. In its broadest definition it includes skin tattooing, socially acceptable decoration (e.g., common body piercing in many societies), and religious rites of passage (e.g., circumcision in a number of cultures), as well as the modern primitive movement.

Body modification is performed for a large variety of reasons, including aesthetics, sexual enhancement, rites of passage, religious beliefs, to display group membership or affiliation, in remembrance of lived experience, traditional symbolism such as axis mundi and mythology, to create body art, for shock value, and as self-expression, among other reasons.

== History ==
Body modification is recorded in ancient practices, with the tattoos on Ötzi's mummy dating to 5300 years ago.

== Cultural significance ==
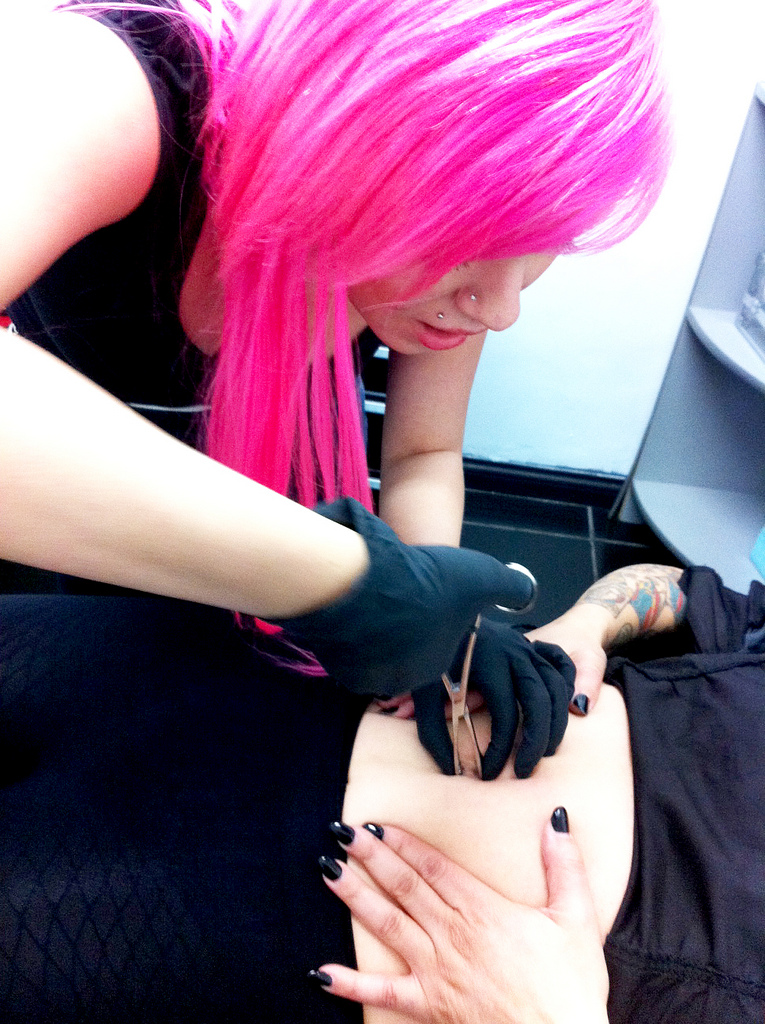
Early stages of getting a navel piercing

What counts as "body modification" varies in cultures. In western cultures, the cutting or removal of one's hair is not usually considered body modification. Body modification can be contrasted with body adornment by defining body modification as "the physical alteration of the physical body [...] can be temporary or permanent, although most are permanent and modify the body forever". Around the globe, body modification has served as group ritual, rite of passage, and group membership.

== Types of body modification ==
- Piercing – permanent placement of jewelry through an artificial fistula; sometimes further modified by stretching
- Tattooing – injection of a pigment under the skin
- Scarification – cutting or removal of dermis with the intent to encourage intentional scarring or keloiding
- Branding – controlled burning or cauterizing of tissue to encourage intentional scarring
- Subdermal implants – implantation of an object that resides entirely below the dermis, including horn implants

== Psychology and motivations ==
Factors behind body modification include group identities, reclaiming bodies, and painful rituals.

Certain body modifications are very common, while others are not as widely recognized. There are many motivations or reasons for wanting to pursue body modifications. They can be a form of faith, a form of assimilation, or for cosmetic purposes. The most common inspirations include:

- Religion

- Beauty

- Group Affiliation

Religion

Religion is one of the biggest motivations for body modifications. There are various religions, and various types of body modifications. Different types of modifications are associated with different religions. The religion of Buddhism views tattoos, specifically yantra tattoos, as a sacred sign of devotion to your faith. Christianity views body modifications differently across denominations, for example, tattoos and body jewelry are typically admissible in most denominations, given they do not promote sinful acts. Along with this, while common body modifications are typically permissible, there is not a common mandated practice of body modifications in most Christian denominations. Male circumcision is a form of body modification, and in Judaism, is practiced as a symbol of partnership between them and God. Native American culture is one of the most recognized cultures by their body modifications. Body painting and labrets are two of the most respected forms of modification in Indigenous culture. Labrets are a sign of rank and lineage.

Beauty

Beauty or aesthetic purposes are also a very common motivation for body modifications. Piercings, specifically ears, are a sign of beauty in most women, leading females to desire piercings. More body modifications used for beauty are Botox, rhinoplasty, breast implants, and liposuction. These are all procedures made to enhance beauty. These cosmetic procedures can be expensive and are often looked at as a sign of wealth. Botox is one of the most common procedures. It can hide wrinkles, leading to a younger appearance, which is a very popular desire among women.

Group Affiliation

Body modifications are used by many to assimilate with different groups. It is common, that following a time or event of stress, trauma, or loss, individuals will seek a tattoo or piercing to represent that. This also applies to hobbies or interests; it is common to see individuals with tattoos of something the like. This is a form of expression and can be a form of assimilating with a group of others who have similar interests. The term “wear my story” related to this, as there are those who pursue tattoos, piercings, or other forms of body modification to align their outer appearance with their core beliefs or interests.

== Health and safety ==
Complications of body modifications may include infection and allergic reactions. Any piercing will create an opening in the skin where bacteria can enter into, causing a rick of

infections, cellulitis, and abscesses. In very rare cases the infection can spread through the body

becoming life threating or even leading to death. If equipment is not properly cleaned between

uses, it can spread bloodborne diseases like hepatitis, HIV, and other bloodborne infections.

There are also risks of allergic reactions to the equipment used, leading to skin irritation, rashes,

or symptoms such as wheezing. After piercing, there is a chance of excessive bleeding, possibly

leading to more serious complications. Piercings have a chance to damage deeper structures such

as blood vessels, nerves, and other tissues. Certain piercings have higher chances of problems,

with oral piercings such as tongue and mouth piercings having high chances of airway.

obstruction, infections, bleeding, gum injuries, tooth damage, speech difficulties, and damaged

oral tissues. These piercings also have the chance of falling out and individuals swallowing

jewelry causing gastrointestinal or respiratory problems. Oral jewelry on the teeth has risks of

gum recession, tooth loss, and damage to teeth. Many adolescents that receive body

modifications do not go to a licensed studio with only 49.3% reporting they went to a legally

licensed studio, this leads to higher risks of infections or other health risks. Most of these safety

concerns can be prevented by going to a repeatable studio with proper sterilization procedures.

Also making sure to properly clean piercings and tattoos in the recommended times, avoiding

pools, hot tubs, and other potential sources of bacteria while it heals.

== Legal considerations ==
Laws related to body modification vary across countries, and parental consent may be required for minors.

Consent: People should have the right to decide what happens to their bodies. Laws may require parental permission for minors.

Health and safety: Body modification procedures can cause infections, scarring, or other complications. Governments may regulate how procedures are performed.

Cultural rights: Some body modifications are important religious or cultural traditions. Laws should consider these practices while protecting individuals.

Age restrictions: Certain modifications may be restricted for people under 18.

Personal freedom: Laws must balance people's rights to express themselves with protecting public health and safety.

Examples From the Book (Pages 146–147)

The book shows African women with scarification patterns on their bodies.

Some markings identify a woman's family or clan.

Certain markings are connected to marriage, adulthood, and cultural expectations.

These traditions raise legal questions about whether modifications are voluntary and how cultural practices should be protected.

Body branding laws are different depending on the state. Some states have specific rules about branding, while others do not clearly address it. Laws may regulate who can perform body modifications and where they can be done. Just because a state does not specifically ban branding does not mean it is automatically legal.

Many states have age restrictions for body modifications. Minors may need parental permission for certain procedures. Some states may prohibit certain body modifications on minors, even with parental consent.

Some states require body modification artists to have licenses.

Artists may need special training in:

o Infection prevention

o Bloodborne diseases

o Sterilization techniques

o Safe equipment handling

Body branding should be performed by trained professionals in approved facilities.

What Are Body Modification Laws?

· Body modification laws regulate procedures such as tattoos, piercings, branding, and other body changes.

· Laws are different depending on the state.

· Federal, state, and local governments all have rules involving body modifications.

· These laws help protect people from unsafe procedures and health risks.

Age Limits and Parental Consent

· Most states require people to be at least 18 to get a tattoo.

· Minors may need written permission from a parent or legal guardian.

· Some states require the parent to be physically present.

· Customers may need to show identification before getting a procedure.

· Some states do not allow tattoos on certain body parts for minors, even with parental permission.

Licensing Requirements

· Tattoo artists and piercers may need special licenses or permits.

· Some states require artists to complete training or apprenticeships.

· Artists must understand how to prevent infections and safely handle equipment.

· Businesses may need permits from their local health departments.

· Performing certain procedures without the proper medical license can lead to serious legal consequences.

Health and Safety Rules

· Equipment must be properly cleaned and sterilized.

· Needles should be new and opened in front of the customer.

· Artists must follow rules for handling blood and other potentially infectious materials.

· Work areas must be clean and disinfected between customers.

· Health inspectors can visit businesses to make sure they follow safety requirements.

· Businesses that break these rules can receive fines or be shut down.

Informed Consent

· Customers must understand the risks before getting a body modification.

· Consent forms explain possible health problems and complications.

· Customers may need to disclose allergies, skin sensitivities, and certain medical conditions.

· Artists should explain the risks both verbally and in writing.

· Minors generally need parental or guardian consent when state law allows the procedure.

Dangerous or Restricted Procedures

· Some body modifications are considered medical procedures instead of regular body art.

· Procedures such as tongue splitting and inserting objects underneath the skin may require a licensed medical professional.

· Some states have banned eyeball tattooing because it can cause permanent damage to eyesight.

· Performing restricted procedures without the proper qualifications can result in criminal charges.

Aftercare Responsibilities

· Artists should provide written instructions explaining how to care for the modified area.

· Customers need to know how to clean the area and prevent infections.

· Warning signs include redness, swelling, unusual drainage, rashes, and fever.

· Artists may face legal problems if they fail to explain important risks or provide proper aftercare instructions.

Body Modifications in the Workplace

· Employers can generally create dress codes about visible tattoos and piercings.

· Some workplaces require employees to cover tattoos or remove certain piercings.

· Religious body modifications may receive legal protection.

· Employers must consider reasonable religious accommodations under federal law.

Legal Consequences

· Artists can receive fines for breaking licensing or sanitation rules.

· Businesses can lose permits or be forced to close.

· Performing procedures on minors without proper consent can lead to criminal penalties.

· Performing medical procedures without the required license can result in serious charges.

· Customers may also file lawsuits if they are injured because of negligence.

== Ethical and social perspectives ==
Body modifications raise ethical questions including harm and threats to autonomy. The ethics of tattoos and other forms of body modification vary throughout different cultures. A good comparison would be between American and Japanese cultures. In America, tattoos originated with Native American tribes and were seen as interesting and meaningful. It lost popularity around the time of World War II and was even banned in some areas due to health concerns. But it has significantly regained its popularity in recent years. In Japan however, tattoos are traditionally viewed as distasteful and for a long time they were forbidden. Until recently, Japan had an incredibly negative view of tattoos due to the fact that a majority of the people wearing them were a part of the Yakuza (Japanese Mafia). Currently, while the Japanese people are beginning to warm up to the idea of tattoos, many people, mostly from older generations, still view them with prejudice and enmity.

== See also ==
- Adornment
- Bioethics
- Blood ritual
- Body hacking
- Church of Body Modification
- Deformity
- Eyeborg
- First haircut
- Genital modification and mutilation
- Genital tattooing
- Human enhancement
- Leblouh
- List of body modifications
- List of people known for extensive body modification
- Makeup
- Microchip implant
- Modern primitive
- Morphological freedom
- Transhumanism
