= List of people known for extensive body modification =

This is a list of individuals known for extensive body modification.

== A ==
- Jessica Alves, (born 1983) Brazilian-British television personality having undergone dozens of plastic surgeries.
- Nina Arsenault, (born 1974) Canadian performance artist.
- Amir Tataloo, (born 1987) Iranian singer, rapper and songwriter for his full body tattoo.

== B ==
- Martina Big, (born 1988) German television personality known for extremely large breast implants and for undergoing a perma-tanning procedure.
- Sarah Burge, (born 1960) British cosmetic surgery proponent, known for undergoing hundreds of cosmetic surgeries.
- Pete Burns, (1959–2016) had extensive polyacrylamide injections into his lips, along with cheek implants, several nose re-shapings, and many tattoos.

== C ==
- Chelsea Charms, (born 1975 or 1976) American exotic dancer who is known for having extremely large breasts.

== D ==
- Elaine Davidson, the "Most Pierced Woman" according to the Guinness World Records.
- Lucky Diamond Rich holds the Guinness world record as "the world's most tattooed person" as of 2006.

== E ==
- The Enigma, has undergone extensive body modification, including horn implants, ear reshaping, multiple body piercings, and a full-body jigsaw-puzzle tattoo.

== F ==
- Lolo Ferrari, (1963–2000) holding the Guinness World Records for most chest enlargement procedures.
- Vladimír Franz, (born 1959) Czech composer, painter and university scholar with extraordinarily extensive tattoos.

== G ==
- Rick Genest "Rico" (The Zombie Boy/Rico the Zombie), Canadian artist and fashion model featured on Lady Gaga's album Born This Way. Had his entire head and torso tattooed so as to appear like a decaying cadaver.
- Julia Gnuse ("The Illustrated Lady") (1955-2016) American woman who had 95% of her body (including her face) covered in tattoos.

== H ==
- Neil Harbisson has an antenna implanted in his skull and a compass implanted inside his knee.
- Steve Haworth, body modification artist, partially responsible for the modern / western popularization of subdermal and transdermal implants.

== J ==
- Cindy Jackson (born 1956) has had more cosmetic surgery procedures than anyone else in the world.
- Justin Jedlica (born 1980) known as the "Human Ken".
- María José Cristerna (born 1976) holding the Guinness World Record for "Most modified woman" in 2014.

== K ==
- Katzen ("Tiger lady"), known for extensive body modifications to look like a cat.
- King Of Ink Land King Body Art The Extreme Ink - Ite (born 1979) as of 2016 held the record for the most simultaneous tattoos.

== L ==
- Tom Leppard, (born 1935) formerly considered by the Guinness Book of World Records to be the world's most tattooed man.
- Anthony Loffredo, (born 1988) creator of The Black Alien Project, using his body as the medium.
- Hao Lulu (born 1979) had extensive cosmetic surgery in 2003 to alter her appearance, tagged "The Artificial Beauty".

== M ==
- Heidi Montag (born 1986), TV personality, had ten plastic surgeries in one day.
- Maxi Mounds (born 1964), American nude big-bust model, known for her extremely large breast implants.
- Fakir Musafar, The father of the modern primitive movement, having exposed himself to body piercing, tightlacing, scarification, tattooing and suspension.

== O ==
- Orlan (born 1947), French performance artist.

== P ==
- Genesis P-Orridge (1950-2020) and Lady Jaye P-Orridge (1969-2007), artists whose "Pandrogeny Project" involved the use of body modification to physically resemble one another, identifying as a single pandrogynous being named "Breyer P-Orridge".
- Diabão Praddo, Brazilian tattoo artist, known for extreme body modifications, including the removal of the ear and the sewing and removal of some fingers, in addition to having more than 80% of his body tattooed.

== R ==
- Horace Ridler ("The Great Omi") (born 1882), has tattoos of a pattern of curved black stripes, often described as zebra-like.
- Roland (Japanese host), whose extensive plastic surgeries have cost over 10 million yen, with 200,000 per month in upkeep costs.

== S ==
- Erik Sprague, "The Lizardman", (born 1972), has sharpened teeth, full-body tattoo of green scales, bifurcated tongue and green-inked lips.
- The Scary Guy, his nose, eyebrows and ears are pierced and tattoos cover 85 percent of his body.
- Stalking Cat ("Cat man") (1958-2012), known for extensive body modifications intended to increase resemblance to a tiger.
- Stelarc, (born 1946) got a cell-cultivated ear implanted into his left arm.

== T ==
- Sahar Tabar (born 2001), Iranian artist, used makeup and photoshop to post distorted images of herself. In December 2020, she was sentenced to ten years in prison for these activities.

== W ==
- Kevin Warwick (born 1954), a British scientist, in 1998 became the first human to experiment with an RFID implant. He followed that up in 2002 by having a 100 electrode array implanted in his nervous system.
- Lacey Wildd (born 1968), American reality television personality, well known for her extreme body modifications and bust proportion.
- Jocelyn Wildenstein ("Lion Queen/Cat Woman") (born 1940), Swiss socialite.
