= María José Cristerna =

Mexican tattoo artist (born 1976)

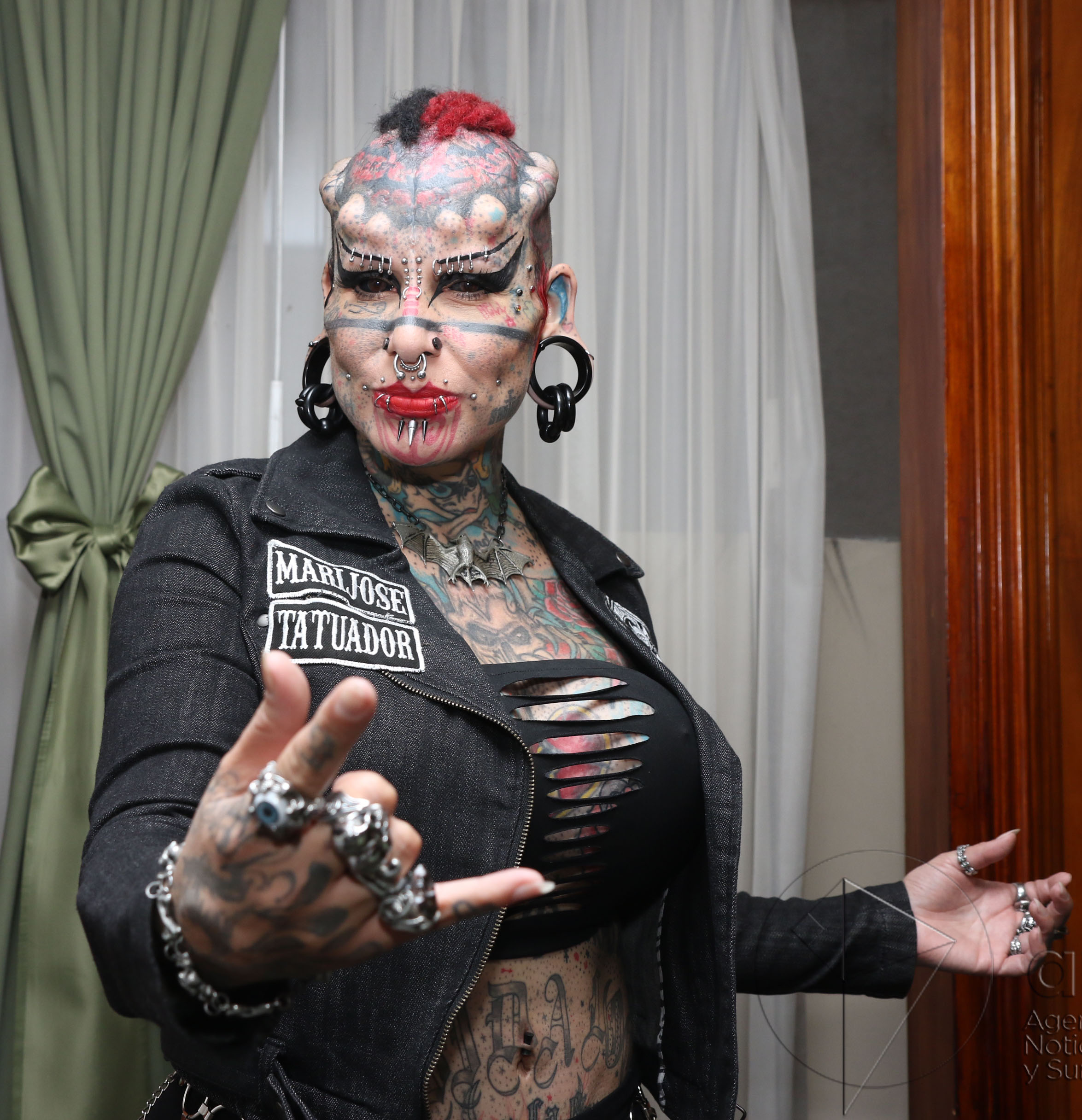
- Cristerna in 2016
- Born: María José Cristerna Méndez; 1976 (age 49–50); Guadalajara, Mexico
- Other names: The Vampire Woman; The Jaguar Woman
- Education: Catholic University of Mexico
- Occupations: Tattoo artist; activist; lawyer; businesswoman
- Known for: Body modification
- Children: 4

María José Cristerna Méndez (born 1976), known professionally as The Vampire Woman or, as she prefers, The Jaguar Woman, is a Mexican lawyer, businesswoman, activist and tattoo artist. She is known for her extensive body modifications, which she embarked on as a form of activism against domestic violence. She is recognized by Guinness World Records as the most tattooed woman in the world, with 96% of her body covered, and is one of the most famous personalities in the world of tattoo art.

== Biography ==
María José Cristerna was born in Guadalajara, Jalisco in 1976, and grew up in a religious family. At age 14, she got her first tattoo, the logo of the Swedish metal band Bathory.

She earned a degree in criminal law at the Catholic University of Mexico. During her first marriage, she was a victim of domestic violence, leading her to decide to modify her body as a sign of strength, courage, and liberation.

In addition to working as a lawyer, Cristerna is a businesswoman and has her own tattoo studio and a boutique where she sells her own clothing line called Mujeres vampiro (Vampire Women).

== Body modification ==
Cristerna is recognized as the most tattooed woman in the world. 96% of her body is covered in tattoos, according to Guinness World Records. The remaining 4% includes the palms of her hands which is a problematic area to tattoo.

Her body modifications also include a split tongue, subdermal implants, piercings, ear expansions, eye tattoos, scarification, and dental implants.

She frequently attends international festivals and conventions on tattoos and body modification. She has also been invited onto various television programs, such as Taboo on the National Geographic Channel, and to events on body suspension.

Ripley's Believe It or Not! has erected a wax statue of Cristerna in its museums.

== See also ==
- BMEzine
- Body suit (tattoo)
- Elaine Davidson
- The Enigma (performer)
- The Lizardman (performer)
