= Human dartboard =

Sideshow act

The human dartboard is a contemporary sideshow act in which one person throws darts at another person. Usually the thrower is the target's assistant or a member of the audience. This act was popularized by the Jim Rose Circus, where it was performed by Jim, in the role of the target, and his wife Bebe, who threw the darts. Usually darts are thrown into the back of the target, and the spine is protected by a board or other long object stuck into the waistband.

== Notable performers ==
- The Lizardman
- Jarppi Leppälä
