= Victor Heck =

American writer

- Born: July 20, 1967 (age 59); St. Louis, Missouri
- Occupations: Novelist, Short story writer, Editor
- Writing career
- Genre: Horror fiction
- Website: myspace.com/victorheck

Victor Heck is the pen name of David Nordhaus, born July 20, 1967 in St. Louis, Missouri, an American editor and horror fiction author. He is the former owner/operator of DarkTales Publications. In 1999, Heck's The Asylum Volume 1: The Psycho Ward was nominated for the British Fantasy Award for Best Anthology.

Nordhaus's DarkTales published books such as J. Michael Straczynski's Tribulations (ISBN 1-930997-0-35), Mort Castle's Moon on the Water (ISBN 0-9672029-9-X), Yvonne Navarro's DeadTimes (ISBN 0-967202-9-57), and Robert Weinberg's Dial Your Dreams and Other Nightmares (ISBN 1-930997-11-6).

In 2007, Nordhaus began to shift gears by making a move into film in various capacities. He is the President of the independent film company Eris Films, LLC. Eris Films' short film Midget Chainsaw Zombie., which Nordhaus wrote the script and dialogue for, won the Troma Team Award for Best Short Film at the 2007 Kansas International Film Festival - a competition which was judged and awarded by Lloyd Kaufman of Troma Entertainment. In April 2008 Nordhaus worked with the director Steve Balderson and Dikenga Films on the movie Watch Out, based on the novel by Joseph Suglia, as a production assistant and performed a small role as The Priest in the film.
