= Forked tongue =

Natural bifurcation that occurs in some animals

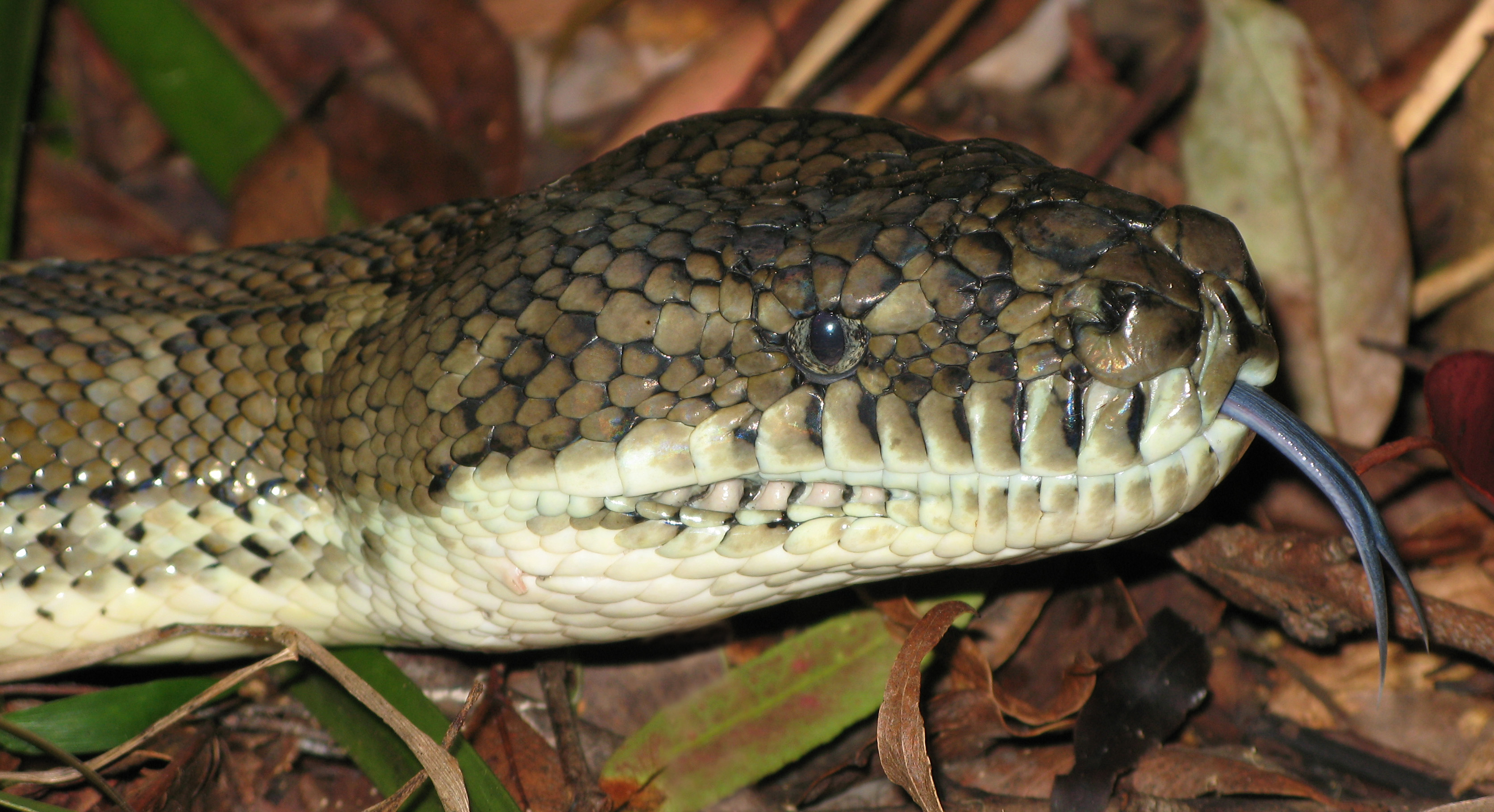
Forked tongue of a carpet python (Morelia spilota mcdowelli)

A forked tongue is a tongue split into two distinct tines at the tip; this is a feature common to many species of reptiles. Reptiles smell using the tip of their tongue, and a forked tongue allows them to sense from which direction a smell is coming. Sensing from both sides of the head and following trails based on chemical cues is called tropotaxis. It is unclear whether forked-tongued reptiles can actually follow trails or if this is just a hypothesis.

Forked tongues have evolved in these squamate reptiles (lizards and snakes) for various purposes. The advantage to having a forked tongue is that more surface area is available for the chemicals to contact and the potential for tropotaxis. The tongue is flicked out of the mouth regularly to sample the chemical environment. This form of chemical sampling allows these animals to sense non-volatile chemicals, which cannot be detected by simply using the olfactory system. This increased ability to sense chemicals has allowed for heightened abilities to identify prey, recognize kin, choose mates, locate shelters, follow trails, and more.

Forked tongues have evolved multiple times in squamates. It is unclear, based on the morphological and genetic evidence, where the exact points of change are from a notched tongue to a forked tongue, but it is believed that the change has happened two to four times. A common behavioral characteristic that has evolved in those with forked tongues is that they tend to be wide foragers.

Hummingbirds also have tongues that split at the tip. Galagos (bushbabies) have a secondary tongue, or sublingua, used for grooming, hidden under their first.

== Usage as an idiomatic expression ==
The phrase "speaks with a forked tongue" means to deliberately say one thing and mean another or, to be hypocritical, or act in a duplicitous manner. In the longstanding tradition of many Native American tribes, "speaking with a forked tongue" has meant lying, and a person was no longer considered worthy of trust, once he had been shown to "speak with a forked tongue". This phrase was also adopted by Americans around the time of the Revolution, and may be found in abundant references from the early 19th century—often reporting on American officers who sought to convince the tribal leaders with whom they negotiated that they "spoke with a straight and not with a forked tongue" (as for example, President Andrew Jackson told the Creek Nation in 1829). According to one 1859 account, the native proverb that the "white man spoke with a forked tongue" originated as a result of the French tactic of the 1690s, in their war with the Iroquois, of inviting their enemies to attend a peace conference, only to be slaughtered or captured.

== Literary usage ==
There are appearances of the phrase "forked tongue" in English literature, either in reference to actual snakes' tongues, or as a metaphor for untruthfulness, such as a sermon by Lancelot Andrewes, who died in 1626:

"And he hath the art of cleaving. He shewed it in the beginning, when he made the Serpent, linguam bisulcam, a forked tongue, to speake that, which was contrarie to his knowledge and meaning, They should not die; and as he did the Serpent's, so he can doe others."

The phrase also appears in Milton's Paradise Lost:

According to his Doom: He would have spoke,
But Hiss for Hiss return'd with forked Tongue
To forked Tongue, for now were all transform'd...

== See also ==
- Ankyloglossia
- Dicroglossidae, family of frogs commonly called the fork-tongued frogs
- Doublespeak
- Silver tongue (disambiguation)
- Tongue splitting (a surgical procedure)
