= The Lizardman (performer) =

American sideshow performer

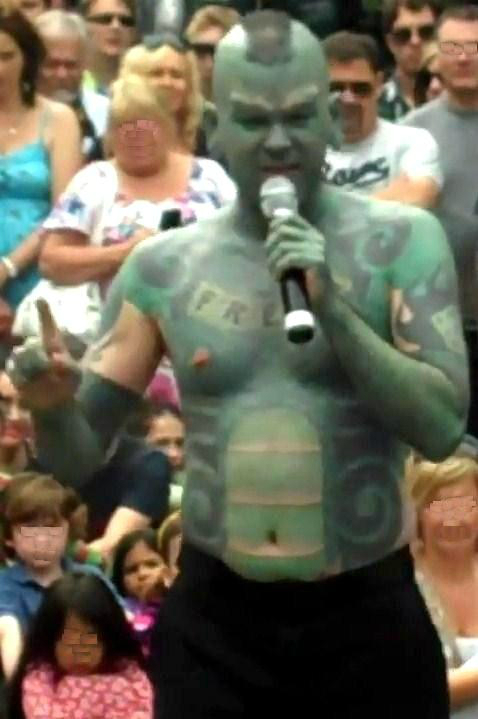
- Sprague in 2012
- Born: June 12, 1972 (age 54); Fort Campbell, Kentucky, United States
- Education: Hartwick College (B.A.)
- Occupations: Freak show and sideshow performer
- Known for: Extensive body modifications
- Spouse: Meghan
- Website: thelizardman.com

Erik Sprague (born June 12, 1972), known professionally as the Lizardman, is an American freak show and sideshow performer. He is best known for his body modification, including his sharpened teeth, full-body tattoo of green scales, bifurcated tongue, subdermal implants and green-inked lips.

== Early life ==
Sprague was born in Fort Campbell, Kentucky, and was a Ph.D. candidate at the University at Albany before beginning his transformation. He holds a Bachelor of Arts degree in philosophy from Hartwick College in Oneonta, New York.

== Career ==
As a professional freak, Sprague became famous for his heavy body modifications, including tongue bifurcation and tattooing. He regularly performs many classic sideshow acts such as the human blockhead, fire eating and breathing, gavage, sword swallowing, the bed of nails, the Human Dartboard, the cranial corkscrew, and the insectivore.

Sprague participates in many public and private flesh hook suspension groups and events, and is highly involved in the body modification community. He also writes articles on the Body Modification E-zine. His rock band, LIZARD SKYNYRD, released an album in late 2010 and performed in many tours around the world.

Sprague gained the official Guinness World Record for 'heaviest weight lifted and spun with pierced ears' on the set of Lo Show dei Record in Milan, Italy on 19 Jun 2014. He also regularly performs with other sideshow celebrities and world record holders such as The Space Cowboy.

He is featured in many of the Ripley's Believe It Or Not books and TV shows. As part of his work with the company, there is a life size statue of him in many of the company's museums.

Sprague has toured with The Jim Rose Circus and hosted the Jägermeister Music Tour, with bands including Disturbed, Slayer, and Slipknot.

== Personal life ==
Sprague resides in Austin, Texas, with his wife Meghan and their pet ferrets.

== Filmography ==
=== Film ===
| Year | Title | Role | Notes |
|---|---|---|---|
| 2005 | Modify | Himself | Documentary about body modification |
| 2007 | Boxboarders! | Himself | |
| 2008 | Sideshow Still Alive | Himself | |
| 2017 | Song to Song | Travel Agent | Credited as Erik Sprague |

=== Television ===
| Year | Title | Role | Notes |
|---|---|---|---|
| 2000 | Ripley's Believe It Or Not! | Himself | Appeared in S1 Ep2 |
| 2004 | Taboo | Himself | TV series documentary |
| 2008 | Weird, True & Freaky | Himself | One episode |
| 2010 | 50 Greatest Plastic Surgery Shockers | Himself | TV movie documentary |

== See also ==
- Jim Rose Circus
- Katzen
- Lucky Diamond Rich
- The Enigma
- Tom Leppard
- Chayne Hultgren
