= Nordhaus =

Nordhaus is a surname. Notable people with the surname include:

- David Nordhaus (born 1967), American horror author, pseudonym Victor Heck
- Steven Nordhaus (born 1966), American general
- Ted Nordhaus (born 1966), American environmentalist
- William Nordhaus (1941–2026), American economist
