= Firecracker (2005 film) =

2005 American thriller film

- Directed by: Steve Balderson
- Written by: Steve Balderson
- Produced by: Beth Wittig; Steve Balderson; Clark Balderson; Jennifer Dreiling; Daniel Holmgren; Jerry P. Magana
- Starring: Karen Black; Mike Patton; Susan Traylor; Jak Kendall
- Cinematography: Jonah Torreano
- Edited by: Steve Balderson
- Music by: Justin R. Durban
- Distributed by: Dikenga Films; First Look Studios
- Release date: October 11, 2005
- Running time: 112 minutes
- Country: United States
- Language: English
- Budget: US$350,000

Firecracker is a 2005 thriller film directed by Steve Balderson, starring Karen Black and Mike Patton, who each play two major roles. Patton and Jak Kendall play brothers David and Jimmy, who live in a small Kansas town in the 1950s and have an abusive relationship. Both brothers become involved with Sandra (Black), a singer with the traveling carnival that visits the town each summer. Sandra is also trapped in an abusive relationship with the carnival owner Frank (also played by Patton). When the carnival leaves town, David also disappears, leading to an investigation of his apparent murder.

== Plot ==
The body of a murder victim is being exhumed from under a storage shed in 1950s small-town Wamego, Kansas. The story leading up to the murder is told.

Handsome, sociopathic David, the owner of a local garage, bullies his meek, sensitive piano-playing younger brother, the teenage Jimmy. Their religious, mentally unbalanced mother, Eleanor, attempts to ignore David's behavior; their withdrawn and ill father is about to be placed in a nursing home. When Jimmy shyly announces at the family dinner table that his piano teacher plans to include him in an upcoming recital, David belittles and beats him, ordering him to give up his "sissy" piano and work at the garage, earn money and be a real man. Jimmy finds temporary escape from his family dysfunction by visiting a traveling carnival that stops in Wamego each summer. He forms a platonic friendship with the premiere sideshow attraction, Sandra, an aging but still glamorous lounge singer. Sandra is virtually a captive of the sadistic carnival owner, Frank, who abuses her emotionally and physically. While Jimmy dreams of running away to play piano for the carnival, Sandra has the opposite dream — to escape the carnival and live a normal life.

Sandra had a past relationship with David, but when he approaches her again, she makes it clear that she is no longer interested in him and tells him that she won't let him "hurt her" again. David goes home and takes out his frustrations on Jimmy, in a scene where sexual abuse is strongly implied but not shown. It is later revealed that David got Sandra pregnant the previous summer, and when the pathologically jealous Frank found out, he cruelly terminated her pregnancy and mutilated her genitals to make her unattractive to other men. Unwilling to take no for an answer, David confronts Sandra at her trailer, and discovers Jimmy hiding there. David flies into a rage, rapes Jimmy in front of Sandra, and storms out. Sandra consoles Jimmy, who goes home. The next day, the carnival leaves town, its departure coinciding with David's disappearance, which the female police chief, Edith "Ed" Carlisle, begins to investigate. It begins to appear that a murder, presumably of David, took place at his family's home.

Meanwhile, the carnival is losing money and Frank's treatment of Sandra is becoming worse, including sending his gang of brutal henchmen to menace her sexually. She resolves to leave and the other carnival freaks bid her goodbye. Jimmy arrives planning to join the carnival, but Sandra, knowing that the carnival is also a dysfunctional environment and not the escape of which Jimmy dreams, sends him home. Frank refuses to let Sandra go and instead chains her up. When Frank comes to see her in her chains, the other freaks help Sandra overpower him, and she strangles him to death with her chains. The freaks hide Sandra from Frank's vengeful henchmen and give her money and a bus ticket to help her escape, but the henchmen capture her in a field and brutally kill her.

Back in Wamego, flashbacks show how David came home to find Eleanor comforting the traumatized Jimmy in a locked room. David broke down the door, dragged Jimmy downstairs and started abusing him. Eleanor, praying, took a pair of scissors from a drawer and stabbed David to death. Jimmy and Eleanor then buried the body under the shed. Pearl, a local psychic girl, realizes the location of David's body and digs up his corpse, revealing a hand to Chief Ed. Eleanor, now clearly mentally ill, is taken away by attendants to a mental institution, while Jimmy cries. In an attempt to save his mother, Jimmy tearfully confesses to David's murder. Jimmy was sentenced to life in prison and later released on parole, at which time Chief Ed, who had become a district judge, sealed the case so no record of it exists today.

== Cast ==
- Karen Black as Sandra / Eleanor
- Mike Patton as Frank / David
- Susan Traylor as Ed
- Kathleen Wilhoite as Jessica
- Jak Kendall as Jimmy
- Brooke Balderson as Pearl
- Paul Sizemore as Officer Harry
- Jane Wiedlin as Ursula
- George McArthur as The Bald Man
- Cathy Berry as Maxine, The Lobster Girl
- Pleasant Gehman as Estelle
- Selene Luna as Harriet
- Susie Legault as Buffalola
- Jeff Montague as The Announcer
- Sean R. Shuford as The Other Man
- The Enigma as himself
- Katzen as herself
- Amy Kelly as Susie Jenkins
- Dean Ackles as Clark
- Richard Villar as John

== Production ==
Writer, director and co-producer Steve Balderson based Firecracker on a real-life murder that occurred in Wamego in the 1950s, three blocks from the house where Balderson grew up. According to Balderson, a traveling carnival visited the town each year on July 4. The murder victim disappeared on the morning of July 5, as the carnival was leaving town, and was later found to have been killed by his brother. Balderson changed the names and some details of the story for his film. He called the finished film "more fiction than fact" and not a historical piece.

Dennis Hopper was originally cast as Frank but dropped out before the film was made. Balderson said this was because Hopper's involvement in the film did not result in financing, so he reverted to his "original vision" of having the same actor play the parts of both Frank and David, and Hopper was "forty years too old" to play David.

The film was shot in Wamego and the surrounding area over two months in 2003, on a budget of just under $500,000. The Ottaway carnival, a real carnival that visited Wamego regularly, was used for the carnival scenes, with local residents as extras.

== Critical reaction ==
Finished in 2005 and released in the first-ever "Freak Show Tour" exclusively in Landmark Theatres, and was released on DVD in 2006. Film critic Roger Ebert called it "Brilliant" and gave Firecracker a Special Jury Award on his list of the year's best films.

Hailed as a “masterpiece” that is “told by a story teller who has a nascent finger on the pulse of contemporary cinema“ (Aftertaste magazine), Firecracker premiered at London’s Raindance Film Festival, to sold out crowds, where it won a Jury Prize nomination for Best Picture. It also won numerous awards on the festival circuit worldwide including: Best Picture, Best Cinematography, Best Actress for Karen Black, and director Steve Balderson won the 2005 Domani Vision Award for emerging talent at Tribeca’s Visionfest.

== Awards ==
- 2005 Visionfest - Winner Domani Vision Award (Steve Balderson)
- 2005 Visionfest - Winner Best Film
- 2005 Visionfest - Winner Best Actress (Karen Black)
- 2005 Visionfest - Winner Best Cinematography
- 2005 Fantasporto - Winner Best Actress (Karen Black)
- 2005 Fantasporto – Best Film Nomination
- 2004 Raindance Film Festival – Best Film Jury Prize Nomination
