= Johnny Strange =

English performer (born 1988)

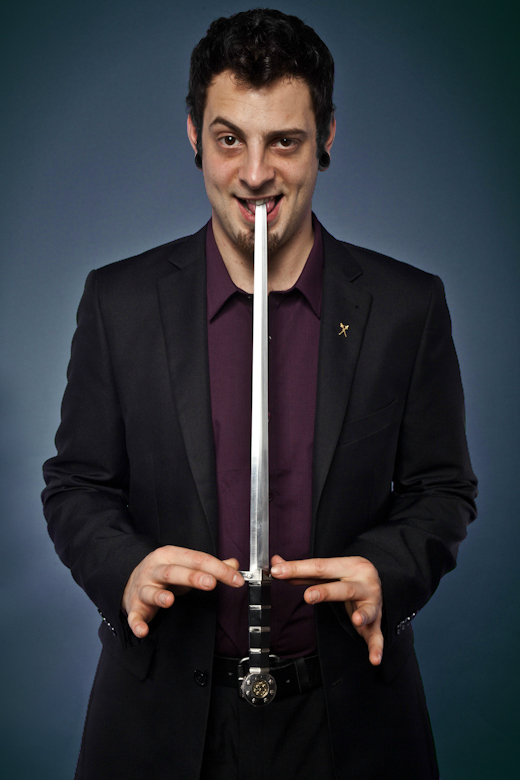
- Johnny Strange in 2013
- Born: 6 December 1988 (age 37); Lancashire, England
- Occupation: Performer
- Years active: 2009–present
- Website: johnnystrange.co.uk

Johnny Strange (born 6 December 1988), nicknamed "the man with ears of steel", is an English world record breaking performance artist, producer, street performer and bestselling author based in London, England. He is known for performing daredevil stunts with a comedic twist.

== Career ==
Johnny Strange began his career as an amateur escapologist after studying the works of Harry Houdini. He began picking handcuffs and escaping from straight jackets, padlocks and chains; this led to him becoming fascinated with Victorian sideshows and freak shows. He has since studied various skills such as juggling running chainsaws, target whip cracking, lifting weights attached to his ear piercings, sharpshooting and prop manipulation as well as classic sideshow and fakir stunts such as sword swallowing, the human blockhead, walking across broken glass, fire eating and breathing, eating broken glass and the bed of nails.

Other stunts and variations include swallowing a magnet then retrieving it by swallowing a sword, swallowing a 2000v glass neon tube, multiple chainsaw stunts and target whip cracking routines.

Johnny Strange has been featured in publications such as Ripley's Believe It or Not! and Guinness World Records as well as appearing on many radio and TV programs.

== Performance ==
Johnny Strange is known for performing daredevil stunts with a comedic twist. His live shows often include demonstrations of mind over body, escape artistry, precision marksmanship, juggling and feats of physical endurance.

In 2012 Strange produced his own variety show titled "Johnny Strange's Theatre of Wonder", which he currently hosts and performs in, alongside a range of circus, sideshow and freak show artists from around the world including; contortionists, knife throwers, snake charmers, strongmen, aerial performers, hand balancers and fire breathers.

According to his official website, Johnny Strange's Theatre of Wonder "brings the golden age of freak shows alive, propelling traditional Victorian sideshow into the 21st century for a new generation".

== Guinness World Records ==
Strange holds multiple Guinness World Records. In 2013 he gained the nickname "the man with ears of steel" after setting the official Guinness World Record for 'the heaviest weight lifted by pierced ears'. Guinness soon challenged him to attempt 'the heaviest vehicle pulled by pierced ears', Strange accepted their challenge and at North Weald Airfield he managed to pull a Cessna 172-P aircraft for 67 ft. After setting this new record Strange became the first person to hold both the record for 'the heaviest weight lifted by pierced ears' and 'the heaviest vehicle pulled by pierced ears' at the same time.

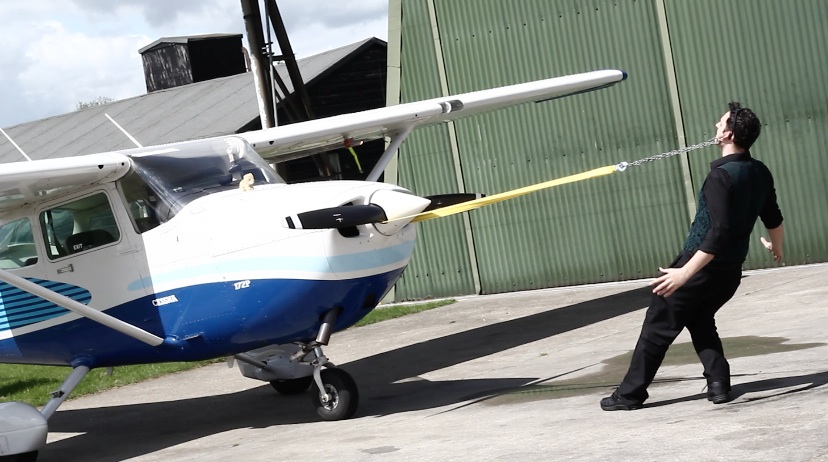
Johnny Strange pulling an aeroplane with his ear piercings

Some of his records include;

- 'The heaviest vehicle pulled by pierced ears' On 12, May 2014 Johnny Strange pulled a vehicle weighing 677.8 kg (1494.5 lbs, 23912oz) for 20.4 meters with his ear piercings.
- 'The heaviest weight lifted by pierced ears' On 21, August 2016 Johnny Strange lifted 21.63 kg (47lb, 10oz) with his ear piercings at Norbreck Castle, breaking his own previous Guinness World Record.
- 'Most swords swallowed in three minutes', On 13, December 2016 Johnny Strange swallowed 16 swords in three minutes on the set of 'Guinness World Records Facebook Live'.
- 'Most newspapers split with a bullwhip in one minute', On 13, December 2016 Johnny Strange split 16 newspapers with a bullwhip in one minute on the set of 'Guinness World Records Facebook Live'.
- 'Most eggs broken with a whip in one minute', On 10, August 2015 Johnny Strange broke 14 eggs using a bullwhip on the set of Guinness World Records: Officially Amazing TV show.
- 'The most apples chainsawed out of the mouth in one minute', On 12, October 2013 Johnny Strange cut 18 apples out of his mouth with a petrol chainsaw in one minute.
- 'The most apples chainsawed out of someone else's mouth in one minute', On 12, October 2013 Johnny Strange cut 12 apples out of his assistant's mouth with a petrol chainsaw in one minute.
- 'The fastest time to break 16 concrete blocks on the body in one minute', On 12, October 2013 Johnny Strange managed to individually break 16 concrete blocks with a sledge hammer on the stomach of his assistant in 30.4 seconds.
- 'The most animal traps released on the body in one minute', On 12, October 2013 Johnny Strange managed to release 6 animal traps onto his hands and arms in one minute.
- 'The most melons chopped in half on somebody's stomach (with a samurai sword while they lay on a bed of nails)'. On 12 October 2013 Johnny Strange managed to individually chop 10 watermelons in half on the stomach of his assistant in 30 seconds.

The Daily Express announced that Strange's 'most melons chopped on the stomach on a bed of nails' record was one of the "best ever Guinness World records". International Business Times listed Strange's 'most apples chainsawed out of the mouth' record as one of "The most weird and wonderful records ever broken". To celebrate 60 years of the Guinness Book of Records, Geek VIP compiled a list of 'The weirdest Guinness World Records ever'; Johnny Strange's 'Heaviest weight lifted by pierced ears' record ranked at number 22.

== Media coverage ==
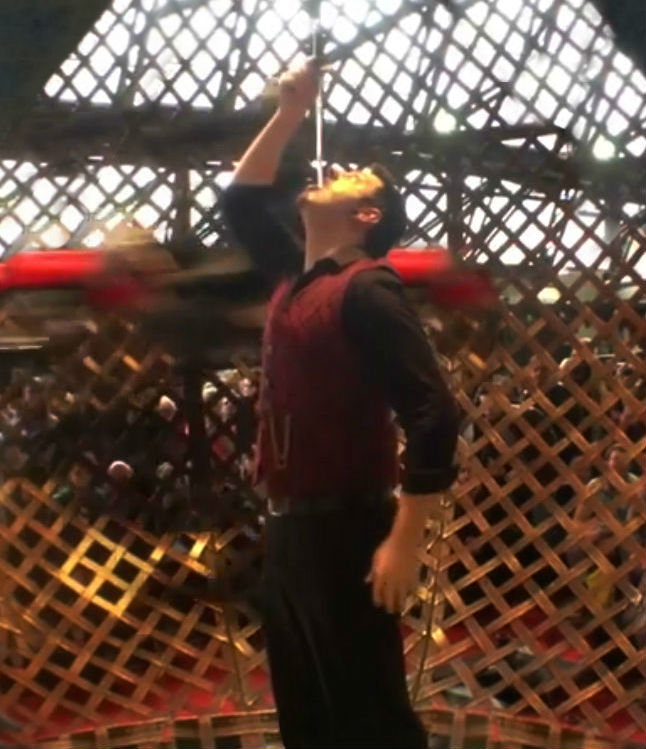
Globe of Death sword swallow

In 2014 Johnny Strange made headlines in several national and international newspapers after teaming up with stunt rider, Vesko Lesev, to perform a unique sword swallowing stunt in Brussels, Belgium, when he became the first person to swallow a sword inside the Globe of death. Strange swallowed a 17-inch long sword blade while standing in the centre of a 5-meter round steel mesh ball as a motorbike rode around him at speeds in excess of 40 mph (70 km/h).

Strange has been quoted as saying that it took three years of practising to master the art of sword swallowing, and that he had to practice daily to achieve it. He went on to say;

"I have been performing sword swallowing for a few years now, it is extremely dangerous. Lesev is a great rider, the skill he shows in the Globe of Death fascinates me but teaming up was still no easy decision to make. There is a lot of trust needed on both parties as one false move could have had devastating consequences for either of us. I have performed in Belgium before but have never performed in Brussels until now, there was an amazing atmosphere and the audiences throughout the weekend were fantastic."

Because of the inherent danger and dedication required to perform such a stunt there are very few sword swallowers in the world, with the Sword Swallowers Association International (SSAI) listing Johnny Strange as one of Europe's last actively performing professional sword swallowers.

== Television appearances ==
| Year | Title | Series |
|---|---|---|
| 2016 | Galileo | Episode: BodyScan |
| 2014 | Ripley's Believe It or Not! | Episode: Do Not Try This |
| 2015 | ITV Studios' '8 Out of 10 Cats Does Countdown' (a cross between '8 Out of 10 Cats' and 'Countdown') | S07, E03 |
| 2015 | CBBC's 'Officially Amazing' | S03, E04 |
| 2016 | наука 2.0 (Science 2.0) | S04, E09 |
| 2016 | Wedden Dat Ik Het Kan | S06, E02 |
| 2023 | A League Of Their Own | Episode: S17, E03 |
| 2021 | Game of Talents | Series 1, 6 Episodes |
| 2018 | Remarkable TV | S01, E01 |
| 2021 | Che! TV | Episode: The Man With Ears of Steel |
| 2022 | Comedy Central's Outrageous Stunts | Episode: Outrageous Stunts |
| 2023 | Bombay Bicycle Club | Music video: My Big Day |
| 2015 | Good Mythical Morning | Episode: Setting Our Own World Records |
| 2019 | LastWeekTonight | Episode: Gurbanguly Berdimuhamedov |
| 2016 | F2Freestylers | Episode: Distraction Penalties |
| 2021 | Sidemen React | Episode: Most Unbelievable Body Mods |
| 2021 | The Sidemen | Episode: Sidemens Got Talent |
| 2018 | Stunt Science | S01, E04 |
| 2014 | Sun Bingo | Episode: Having A Ball |
| 2017 | Guinness World Records | Episode: Most swords swallowed in 3 minutes |
| 2016 | Guinness World Records | Episode: Most newspapers split with a bullwhip in one minute |

In 2021 Strange appeared in an episode of The Sidemen titled 'Sidemens Got Talent' where he lifted a beer keg with his ear piercings and swallowed swords – eventually letting KSI pull a swallowed sword out of his throat. Miniminter also made him an honorary member of the Sidemen. This was his second appearance with The Sidemen, his first being in an episode of Sidemen React titled 'Most Unbelievable Body Mods'.

== Book author ==
In 2023 Strange authored a book called 'Unusual As Usual: Bizarre stories of historical circus, sideshow and freak show performers' based on his YouTube project of the same name. The Book was released on 10 March 2023 and reached the number-one bestseller position on Amazon within 24 hours of its release. This was quickly followed up with the second book of the series 'Unusual As Usual: Abnormal Animals' the same year.

On the Youtube channel, Strange hosted several series including: 'Abnormal Animals', 'Anatomical Oddities', 'Modified Marvels', and 'Peculiar People'.

In 2024 Strange released his third book, the official biography of Elaine Davidson, the 'Most Pierced Woman In The World' according to Guinness World Records. The book, titled 'Elaine Davidson: Holier Than Thou', talks all about Davidson's life and career as a performer.

== Affiliations ==
Johnny Strange has been recognised as an active member of;

- Sword Swallowers Association International (SSAI)
- The International Jugglers' Association (IJA)
- United Kingdom Escape Artists (UKEA)
