= Teachers TV =

UK distance education service

- Teachers TV logo (2007-2010)

Ownership
- Owner: Education Digital Management Limited

History
- Launched: 8 February 2005
- Closed: TV: 31 August 2010; Web: 29 April 2011

Availability

Terrestrial
- Freeview: Channel 88 (16:00–18:00 only) ceased broadcasting on 21 July 2010

Teachers TV was a UK government–funded educational website and free-to-air distance education television channel that operated from 2005 to 2011. It provided professional development videos and support materials for teachers, school leaders, trainee teachers, and other education staff.

The service aimed to raise educational standards and support continuing professional development, with all content available free of charge. Teachers TV was funded by the Department for Children, Schools and Families and operated independently of government editorial control. Funding was withdrawn in 2011, after which the service ceased operations, though much of its content remains available online.

== Programming ==
General programming included a weekly half-hour news programme, documentaries on the educational issues and controversies of the day, and guidance on topics such as behaviour management.

It covered all National Curriculum subjects, as well as specialist programmes for headteachers, managers, newly qualified teachers (NQT), teaching assistants (TA), and governors. It also had an educational news service supplied by ITN.

== Charter ==
While it was funded by the DCSF, Teachers TV was editorially independent of government. This was a requirement of the Communications Act 2003 and Ofcom, the regulator for the UK communications industries. To ensure accountability for its funding, a governance process was established, managed by the Teachers TV Board of Governors.

== Operations ==
Teachers TV (TTV) was a government-funded, advertisement-aided programme for teachers. It was initially an online TV channel, then just a web vehicle for specific professional training — Continuous Professional Development, or CPD, mainly via video experiences across all curricula, age groups and other school based issues, specifically aimed at teachers. It was managed by Ten Alps. The website was co-owned by Ten Alps (75%) and ITN (25%).

2011 saw the launch of Teaching Channel, a US initiative to deliver professional development videos for teachers over the Internet, public television, cable and other digital outlets.

== Decline and closure ==
In March 2010, Ed Balls, then Secretary of State for Children, Schools and Families (DCSF) axed the broadcast deals in place with Freeview, Freesat, Sky and Virgin Media in a bid to save the channel around £1m in carriage costs annually. It closed on Freeview first on 21 July, and Freesat, Sky and Virgin followed on 31 August 2010. Online availability was unaffected by the change.

On 15 October 2010, Ten Alps announced that the Department for Education was cancelling the £10m annual Teachers TV contract from April 2011. The contract was due to run until 2013, but the government invoked a six-month break clause. The service had 400,000 registered users. It provided 783,000 training day sessions online in 2009 and claimed to have saved schools an estimated £235m.

In 2011 a number of providers gained a licence from the Department for Education to distribute the Teachers TV videos. Only those videos which were commissioned by the Teachers TV service are available under the terms of the licence.

== Reception ==
Deemed 'successful', Teachers TV gained a wide audience of teachers, heads, assistants and governors, with over 3,500 best practice videos and further raw material for up to 6,000 with investment into new content regularly. Government funding was withdrawn April 2011, and Teachers TV ceased to exist, but all the content was made available for those organisations that would be able to provide free access to all the material for teachers nationally in the UK.

Popular videos included those by behaviour experts John Bayley, Sue Cowley and The Scary Guy, as well as teachers and other school workers who showed hands-on examples of good practice.

As of April 2018, 107 entries from the Teachers TV back catalogue are flagged as "recommended by TES" in the active TES archive.
