= Valerie Flake =

- Film poster
- Directed by: John Putch
- Screenplay by: Robert Tilem
- Starring: Susan Traylor; Jay Underwood; Terrence Howard
- Release date: 1999
- Country: United States
- Language: English

Valerie Flake is a 1999 American drama film directed by John Putch.

Lead actress Susan Traylor was nominated for the Independent Spirit Award for Best Female Lead for her performance.

== Plot ==
A supermarket cashier in her early thirties must deal with the death of her husband.

== Cast ==
- Susan Traylor – Valerie Flake
- Jay Underwood – Tim Darnell
- Christina Pickles – Meg Darnell
- Peter Michael Goetz – Douglas Flake
- Rosemary Forsyth – Irene Flake
- Terrence Howard – Hitchhiker (as Terrence Dashon Howard)
- Ann Gillespie – Barbara
- Sarah Bibb – Tammy
- Kevin Rahm – Jogger Ronald
- Richard Cummings Jr. – Rooftop Guard
