= Sahar Tabar =

Iranian Internet personality (born 2001)

- Born: Fatemeh Khishvand; 16 June 2001 (age 25); Tehran, Iran
- Criminal charges: Blasphemy, Depravity and encouragement to depravity, Acquiring wealth through illegal means
- Penalty: Charged with three crimes (acquitted of two charges). Awaiting verdict.

Fatemeh Khishvand (Persian: فاطمه خویشوند, known by her alias Sahar Tabar, Persian: سحر تبر; born 16 June 2001), is an Iranian Internet personality who gained attention for posting heavily distorted images of herself to Instagram. It was rumored that she had altered her face through as many as fifty cosmetic surgeries. Tabar was interviewed on Iranian national television in October 2019 after she was arrested on charges including blasphemy and illegally obtaining money. It was reported that Tabar was sentenced to ten years imprisonment in December 2020.

A few days after the publication of the news of her 10-year prison sentence, her release on bail was announced. Tabar stated, "The judge has agreed to convert the arrest order into a bail order, and I have been released from prison after posting the bail." Tabar also told reporters that she was acquitted of two charges and that she had filed an appeal and was waiting for the final verdict.

== Images ==
Tabar's Instagram account attracted over 486,000 followers. The images posted featured distorted facial features that included exaggerated lips and a pointy, turned-up nose. In a 2017 interview with Sputnik News, Tabar explained the images were created primarily using makeup and Photoshop. At that time, the cosmetic procedures she underwent were limited to rhinoplasty, liposuction, and injectable fillers in her lips. Some of the photos and videos shared online appear to have been heavily edited to resemble Hollywood star Angelina Jolie, but Tabar denied this intention.

== Arrest ==
On 5 October 2019, Tabar was arrested in Tehran on charges of "blasphemy, instigating violence, illegally acquiring property, violating the national dress code and encouraging young people to commit corruption" according to the Tasnim news agency, which also stated that the arrest was a response to complaints from the public. Her Instagram account was deleted at the time of her arrest. Three days later, three more female Instagram influencers were arrested in Iran: Sahra Afsharian, Sara Shariatmadari and Niloufar Moti'ei. In December 2020, she was granted bail and was released from prison.

== Iranian television ==
On the Islamic Republic of Iran Broadcasting Channel 3 (IRIB TV3), it was reported that Tabar faced a prison sentence of between three months and two years on charges of "obtaining money through illegitimate means, and publishing inappropriate and vulgar photographs".

Tabar was introduced as a "zombie" for a pre-trial interview broadcast on 22 October 2019 by IRIB TV2. Although her face was blurred in the broadcast, Tabar stated that she did not look like her Instagram images because they were heavily Photoshopped in an attempt to look like the titular character in Corpse Bride. She told the interviewer that her childhood dream was to become famous, and she had persisted with building her Instagram following despite the objections of her mother. Tabar admitted that she had not completed high school, and the broadcast claimed that her efforts to gain online fame had prevented her from advancing to higher education.

The IRIB TV2 interview mitigated the charges against Tabar by presenting her as a person with a psychological disorder, who had believed her posts were acceptable because of the encouragement she received from her many Instagram followers. Nonetheless, Tabar later received a ten-year prison sentence.

== See also ==
- List of people known for extensive body modification
