= Susan Traylor =

American actress

- Born: New York, United States
- Occupations: Actress, Writer, Director, & Producer
- Years active: 1988–present
- Spouse: Jesse Dylan
- Children: 2
- Parents: William Traylor (father); Peggy Feury (mother)
- Relatives: Bob Dylan (father-in-law); Sara Dylan (mother-in-law); Jakob Dylan (brother-in-law)

Susan Traylor is an American actress who has appeared in over 50 films. She was nominated for the Independent Spirit Award for Best Female Lead for her performance in Valerie Flake (1999). Traylor's starring role in Valerie Flake also won the inaugural best feature award at The Women's Image Network Awards.

== Personal life ==
When Traylor was a baby, her father went to Malibu, California to work on a film. Shortly afterwards, her mother brought Traylor and her sister to California, where they were then raised. Traylor studied acting at her parents' acting school, "The Loft Studio", and also went to film school at NYU.

Traylor is married to Jesse Dylan; they have two children, William Pablo Dylan & Feury Mae Dylan.

== Filmography ==
=== Film ===
Year	Title	Role	Notes
1992	A River Runs Through It	Rawhide	
1994	Sleep with Me	Deborah	
1994	The New Age	Ellen Saltonstall	
1995	To Die For	Faye Stone	
1995	Lord of Illusions	Maureen Pimm	
1995	Heat	Elaine Cheritto	
1996	Bastard Out of Carolina	Alma	
1997	She's So Lovely	Lucinda	
1997	After the Game	Veronica Kowalski	
1998	Broken Vessels	Susy	
1998	Finding Graceland	Maggie	
1999	Valerie Flake	Valerie Flake	
1999	If... Dog... Rabbit...	Lulu	
2000	Tempest Eye	Karen Jarek	
2002	Ten Tiny Love Stories	Eight	
2003	Masked and Anonymous	Mrs. Brown	
2005	Firecracker	Ed	
2005	Welcome to California	Undine	Writer, Director, Producer
2009	Stuck!	MeMe	
2010	Greenberg	Carol Greenberg	
2010	Passion Play	Red	
2010	The Sleepy Count	Susan	Short film
2011	The Casserole Club	Sugar Bainbridge	
2012	The Pyrex Glitch	Christina Crawford	
2012	All the Light in the Sky	Carol	
2012	Cull	Victoria	
2013	Snake and Mongoose	Mrs. McWorter	
2013	Jake Squared	Jocelyn	
2014	Me	Susan	
2015	El Ganzo	Lizzy	Co-Writer
2015	Anatomy of the Tide	Kim Brewer	
2017	Woodshock	Theresa's Mother	
2018	The Con Is On	Diane St. Cliare	
2018	Glass	Nadine	Short film

=== Television ===
Year	Title	Role	Notes
1995	Sisters	Sandra	"A Tough Act to Follow"
1998	Touched by an Angel	Karla	"Redeeming Love"
1999	Chicken Soup for the Soul	Mrs. Bailey	"The Heart of Christmas"
2000	Code Blue	Jackie Slavin (voice)	Video game
2001	ER	Mrs. Schudy	"Never Say Never"
2003	Dragnet	Marcia Hills	"The Silver Slayer"
2004	Judging Amy	Ellen Shein	"Sins of the Father"
2007	Big Love		"Damage Control"
2012–2016	Tuberville	Molly	"Pilot", "One Potato, Two Potato", "Spud", "A Murphy in Transition"
2016	House Poor	Stefani	"Rent Their Rooms?", "Lucky Me!", "Raven Returns"
