= Matt Alaeddine =

Canadian-based entertainer

(Kamal) Matt Alaeddine is a Canadian-based entertainer from Edmonton, Alberta who is the world's fattest contortionist. He has travelled around the world performing in a variety of venues. After getting his start at the Edmonton Fringe Festival, he has gone on to appear on The Tonight Show with Jay Leno, Canada's Got Talent, and Comedy Central's Gong Show. He holds the world records for "Heaviest Man to Touch Own Feet to Ears" and "Heaviest Man to Fit Through a Hula Hoop."

He is known by many nicknames and stage names including Fatt Matt, Big Mac, and Powermann,

== Abilities ==
Despite his 400+ pound weight, Alaeddine is skilled at contortion. He is capable of performing a side split. He can also dislocate his shoulders which he can use to escape from a straitjacket. He can place his leg behind his head, or create a form he refers to as the "fruit bowl" in which he touches both the soles of his feet to his cheeks

== The Jim Rose Circus ==
In 2004 Alaeddine joined The Jim Rose Circus alongside fellow Edmontonian Ryan Stock. As part of the Jim Rose Circus, he has performed as far away from his hometown as Iceland and Australia.

== Comedy career ==
Named Edmonton's funniest working comedian, Alaeddine is also a well-known stand-up comic. Alaeddine also hosted The Comedy Clubhouse on CJSR-FM.
