= Pleasant Gehman =

American author, writer, poet, actress

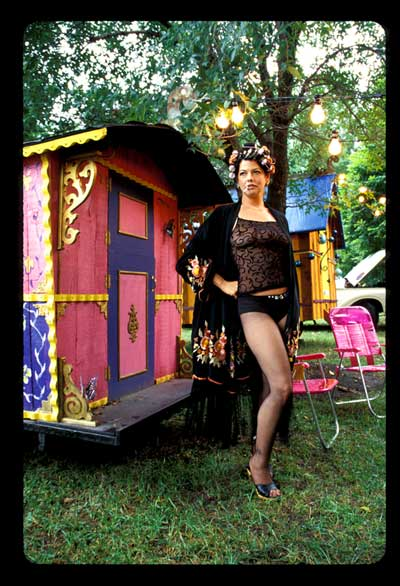
- Gehman as Estelle in Firecracker (2005)
- Other name: Princess Farhana
- Occupations: Author; writer; poet; actress; dancer; musician
- Years active: Late 1970s–present
- Website: pleasantgehman.com

Pleasant Gehman is an American author, writer, poet, actress, dancer and musician from Los Angeles.

== Career ==
In the 1980s, she was the singer for the punk rock band Screamin' Sirens.

Her articles on rock 'n' roll, American pop culture, sex, the arts and human interest have appeared in L.A. Weekly and BAM. She has written and edited a number of books, including Showgirl Confidential, The Belly Dance Handbook, Senorita Sin, Princess of Hollywood, Escape From Houdini Mountain and The Underground Guide to Los Angeles.

In 1994, she recorded a collection of her poetry and spoken-word routines entitled Ruined. Among the venues where she has performed spoken-word pieces include The Unhappy Hour at the Parlour Club.

She co-starred in Margaret Cho's Off-Broadway variety show, The Sensuous Woman, in 2007 and again shared the stage with Cho in a 2012 Victory Variety Hour performance.

She appeared as Estelle in Steve Balderson's film Firecracker.

In April 2009, Pleasant worked with cult director Steve Balderson for Stuck! - an homage to film noir women in prison dramas. Co-starring Karen Black, Mink Stole, Susan Traylor, and The Go-Go's Jane Wiedlin. Stuck! was filmed in Macon, Georgia and released in 2010.

== Books ==
- Rock 'n' Roll Witch: A Memoir of Sex, Magick, Drugs and Rock 'n' Roll (2022, Punk Hostage Press) ISBN 978-1-940213-11-8)
- Showgirl Confidential: My Life Onstage, Backstage And On The Road {Punk Hostage Press) ISBN 978-1-940213-75-0)
- The Belly Dance Handbook: A Companion For The Serious Dancer {Princess Productions} ISBN 978-0615938318)
- Escape From Houdini Mountain (Manic D Press, ISBN 978-0916397685)
- Senorita Sin (1994, Incommunicado Press, ISBN 978-0962701399)
- Princess Of Hollywood (1997, Incommunicado Press, ISBN 978-1884615108)
- The Underground Guide To Los Angeles (1999, Manic D Press, ISBN 978-0916397562)
