= Anthony Loffredo =

French extreme body modification artist

- Anthony Loffredo
- Born: c. 1988; Montpellier, France
- Other name: The Black Alien
- Occupation: Body modification artist

Anthony Loffredo (b. France, c. 1988) is an extreme body modification artist. He was the subject of a Channel 4 documentary in 2023. In a 2023 article in El País, Loffredo was called "one of the most recognized icons in the world of extreme body modification."

== The Black Alien Project ==
Loffredo started modifying his body aged 26 by splitting his tongue. He considers himself an artist who uses his body as the medium. He refers to the ongoing development of his body, which he regards as a work in progress, as "The Black Alien Project". He does not consider his changes mutilation, rather "a personal evolution and an aesthetic improvement". In a 2021 interview he explained that modifying his body "made him feel better about himself". Arthur Bruel made a documentary about Loffredo, I Transformed Myself Into An Alien (or The Black Alien Project), which aired on Channel 4 digital in June 2023.

Modifications include:

- Tongue splitting
- Two finger amputations on his left hand
- Ear removal
- Part-nose removal
- Top lip removal
- Skull implants
- Subdermal implants
- Scarification
- Removal of dermis
- Removal of scalp
- Teeth sharpening
- Eye tattoo
- Almost full black tattoo coverage
- Piercings

As most of these modifications are illegal in many countries, Loffredo travelled internationally to find people who would be prepared to work with him. He collaborated extensively with Mexican modifiers, Gatto Moreno and Drake Bryan. In late 2023 Loffredo paused his modification process. He had planned to amputate a leg to replace it with "a biomechanical prosthesis" but as of May 2024 had not gone ahead with it.

In December 2023 Loffredo announced the Black Alien Project was finished, and that "the project had lost all meaning to him." He planned to complete his metamorphosis with a "full cover-up" of black ink.

== Other ==
Before starting his body modifications Loffredo worked as a nightclub security guard. He moved to Australia aged 24. He currently lives in Guadalajara, Mexico. He speaks French, Spanish and English. Loffredo makes a living as a photography and video model, a brand collaborator and a tattoo artist.
