= Globe of death =

Stunt where riders ride motorcycles inside a mesh sphere ball

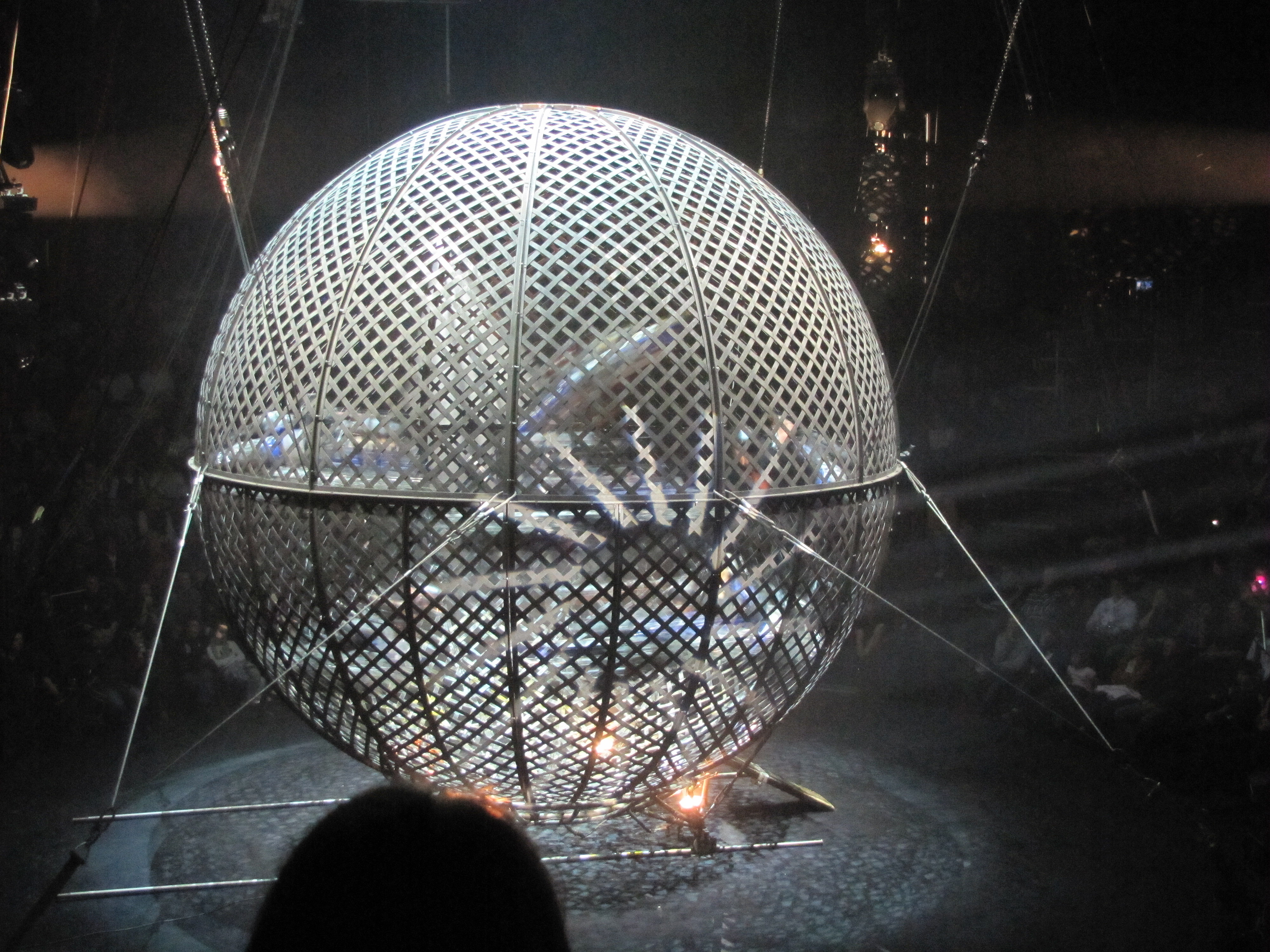
Performance at "Flic Flac" in 2010

The Globe of Death is a circus and carnival stunt where stunt riders ride motorcycles inside a mesh sphere ball. It is similar to the wall of death, but in this act riders can loop vertically as well as horizontally. There have been three performance-related deaths recorded between 1949 and 1997. The only Globe of Death World Record officially recognized by the Guinness World Records is six riders and one person in the center by the Infernal Varanne team on the set of Lo Show Dei Record, in Milan, Italy, on 13 April 2011.

For its 2008 touring edition, Ringling Bros. started using the name Globe of Steel, as the word death was not seen as family friendly from a public relations perspective.

== Notable instances ==
Leo Garcia of the Garcia Family Thrill Riders designed and built the very first (horizontal) Triple Splitting Globe of Death in 2006. This Globe is the only one of its kind that hydraulically lifts 5 feet off the ground and splits/separates into three sections while the Garcia Thrill Riders race their motorcycles in the center piece with a 4-foot gap underneath them. During this operation, the entire sphere lifts at over 23 feet high.

In the 134th Edition of Ringling Bros. and Barnum & Bailey Circus, Crazy Wilson Dominguez (who normally performs on the Wheel of Death) is the first person to split the Globe of Death apart from the top. During this stunt, four sections of the globe are split apart, with three members of his family on motorcycles staying in the parts of the globe which are still welded together.

The Record for "Youngest Person To Ride A Motorcycle In 'The Globe Of Death'" is Maximus Garcia (Now Maximus Kehayov), who was four years, six months, and 28 days old on August 16, 2006.

In June 2015 in Vilnius, Lithuania, the largest outdoor Globe of Death was constructed, standing at 12 metres (39 ft) tall. A total of 12 consecutive loops were performed in the Globe with a 900-kilogram (2,000 lb) car.

In 2014 in Belgium, Johnny Strange became the first person to swallow a sword inside the Globe of Death when he teamed up with Vesko Lesev of Globe of Death EU to combine the two dangerous arts.

== Construction of the globe ==
The globe of death is produced using several segmented, bowed portions of welded mesh where sections of material are fitted together and riveted. One panel of steel at the bottom of the globe acts as a trap door where riders and their bikes can enter and exit. While there are standards, many groups of riders use their own globes of various sizes. While the 5,300 pound 16 foot globe is most common, some performers use smaller sizes, and even 17 foot globes.

== Motorcycles ==
The most commonly used bike in the globe of death act are dirtbikes. The majority of riders use single cylinder dirt bikes to traverse the globe. Often made from mass market manufacturers such as Suzuki or Honda, riders tend to choose bikes that are lightweight and with high torque so that they can quickly achieve the speed required to complete loops within the sphere. Many riders may also have to go from high speeds to a dead stop very quickly. While mass market bikes are cheaper to use in the globe many riders customize their bikes to their liking; this is because the globe of death stunt does not require a bike with a powerful engine, suspension, and drive train as they require a top speed of only 40 to 65 miles per hour or 65 to 105 kilometres per hour. Stock dirt bikes are limited and so performers modify the bikes in order to make the stunt safer and easier.

== Physics ==
The physics of the trick are centered around the manipulation of centripetal force. This is the force that acts on an object as it moves around in a circular path. All forces have a direction in which they push, and centripetal force is directed towards the center of the circular path. It can be calculated using the following formula:

$F_c=\frac{m\times v^2}r$

Where:

$F_c$ is the centripetal force

$m$ is the mass of the object

$v$ is the speed at which the object is moving

$r$ is the radius of the circular path. The radius of a circle is the distance from the center of the circle to the outer edge. It is half the length of the diameter.

For a rider wanting to complete a vertical loop, the minimum speed required of the rider is:

$v=\sqrt{g\times r}$

Where $r$ is the radius of the sphere, and $g$ is Earth's gravitational acceleration.

== Performance ==
This 5-8 minute long spectacle can have quite a physical impact on the riders as 3.5–5.5gs are put on the surface of the globe. At the apex, many riders "grey-out", which is a transient loss of vision, not as severe as a total blackout. In addition to grey-outs, for many riders vertigo and nausea is a huge problem as the act is inducing to such symptoms. Because of this, physical fitness of the riders is extremely important. In addition to fitness keeping a healthy diet is just as important because the rider's body mass completely affects the entire act. Some riders will say that they try to concentrate on a particular point in order to "reverse" the effects of the g-forces. These experienced riders say the right way to counteract greying-out is to use peripheral vision, and to choose particularly the center of the globe towards the bottom.

== History ==
Prior to the Globe of Death came what is known as the Basket of Death. Little is known about this Corbeille de la Mort (which translates to 'Basket of Death') other than that these extended cycle whirl tracks were impetus for fully enclosed metal globes. The basket has paltry bracing, making it incredibly dangerous for two people to ride together in tandem in the basket.

The circus act now known as the Globe of Death first started to appear in 1901 as the cycle whirl, which had slatted vertical columns instead of a complete sphere. Several carnival historians, including A.W. Stencell, attribute the premier Globe of Death act to Thomas Eck in 1903; however, others consider Arthur Rosenthal of Grand Rapids, Michigan the first as he patented the "Bicyclist's Globe" in 1904. This patent claims to have invented "certain new and useful improvements in Bicyclists Globes": these new and useful improvements delve into the specifications for the creation of a latticed globe so the bicyclists could attain sufficient momentum to perform the act. The popularization of the act began with Arthur Rosenthal, the man who patented the globe, and Frank Lemon. Together they were known in the area as "Rose and Lemon," a trick bicycle and motorcycle duo, who performed in the globe as the climax of their act. Their show was said to perform routines of skill and nerve guaranteed to deliver laughs and roars at fairs, amusement parks, and shows across the land. Although Arthur Rosenthal is known for patenting what became known as the "Globe of Death," several other performers started to use similar globes around this time, including Guido Consi, an Italian daredevil who introduced his "Sphere of Fear" to European audiences in Rome; a German engineer who built and operated his own globe; and the act "Cedero and his Golden Globe," which arrived in New York City and was the first of many Brazilian globes and globe riders to migrate to the United States. One of the most successful shows was the Hazardous Globe Of Death where "Mr. and Mrs. Charles Clark" both employed Indian motorcycles inside a 16-foot sphere. Another well-known motorglobe act was the Mendoza family from Australia who began each of their shows using bicycles and finished on motorcycles; their climax was the "Globe of Fate", which they kept covered by a canvas tent so as to compel paid entry.

A Young Greek woman, who went by the stage name CeDora, gained much notoriety since women riders presented a special attraction in the Globe of Death.

Because of the cage's tighter radius and slight bracing, lightweight motorcycles with a short wheelbase are required for the performances. Two-stroke engines weigh less and provide a better acceleration. Many riders equipped their bikes with working headlights that added a dramatic effect.

There were a small number of operators who handled, and performed in, globes; among those that did were Louis "Speedy" Babbs, Zeke Shumway, and Jack Hatcher. Babbs claimed that because riding in a globe required a different technique than riding in a motordrome, it was difficult to operate and perform the routines. In 1947, after nearly 20 years of riding motordromes, Babbs acquired a globe and booked it with carnivals across the eastern United States, marketing himself as the "Man from Mars", and on several occasions, he fell during the job and was almost killed, situations like this were not as frequent while he rode the motordrome.

Despite arguments between both parties over which is more dangerous for the performer, because of the visual obstruction created by the lattice and the distance at which the audience usually viewed, the presentation of the globe is more limited than that of the motordrome.

Some performers found themselves in a situation like George "Lucky" Thibeault who was a motordrome operator and performer in the Boston area but acquired a Globe of Death in 1966. While searching for places to perform his newfound attraction, he found that some carnivals were reluctant to sign such an attraction when they already had a motordrome. Thus, instead, he performed at shopping center promotions, stock car races, and other fundraisers.

== Notable accidents ==
The Globe of Death, as its name implies, is a very dangerous stunt. There have been many accidents involving this act. Some have occurred due to the globe breaking or otherwise failing, causing the riders to lose control and crash. Others have been due to rider error. Some recent incidents are listed below:

May 24, 2014: Five motorcyclists were injured when performing stunts in the "Globe of Death", during a function in Circus Rhodes in Argentina. They were injured when the roof of the globe burst, sparking a multiple collision. One of the riders suffered a broken clavicle and others had burns and minor injuries from the motorcycles.

May 25, 2015: Two motorcycle riders crashed in midair while performing the stunt at Uncle Sam's Great American Circus in Chantry Park, Ipswich, England. One rider sustained head injuries while the other was injured in the leg and upper body, but both riders recovered without any permanent injuries.

April 6, 2015: Three riders collided and crashed to the ground while performing at the Jordan World Circus at the Washington State Fair in Puyallup, Washington. One motorcyclist suffered a broken leg and another a broken rib.

July 7, 2015: Stunt riders from the Great Moscow Circus crashed while performing the Globe of Death at Munro Martin Park in Cairns, Queensland, Australia. Six riders were reported injured, with two suffering arm fractures with one also reporting neck tenderness.

December 9, 2016: In Colombia, stunt rider Cristian Camilo Hernández Sáenz was killed while riding with three other riders. The 20-year-old performer fell and later died in hospital, apparently of an internal hemorrhage.

== In popular culture ==
- In The Simpsons Movie, Homer wins a truck by making a full 360-degree cycle of the Globe of Death after failing on his first three tries. The climax of the film sees Homer and Bart save Springfield by recreating the stunt along the walls of the glass dome surrounding the town.
- In the 2012 film The Place Beyond the Pines, Ryan Gosling's character performs the Globe of Death stunt with two other motorcyclists.
- In the Dinotrux episode "Super Scraptors", the characters build a rolling cage similar to the Globe of Death.
- In Danganronpa: Trigger Happy Havoc, Mondo Owada is killed by being melted by extreme G-Forces while riding the Globe Of Death.
