= Ann Gillespie =

American actress

Ann Gillespie is a retired American actress who became an Episcopal priest, and as of December 2023 is the Senior Associate Rector at Church of the Holy Comforter in Vienna, Virginia.

== Life and career ==
Gillespie is a graduate of Dwight Morrow High School in Englewood, New Jersey. Her father was an Episcopal priest. She made her television debut appearing in the 1981 made-for-television movie Kent State. Gillespie later made her regular television debut when she became the second actress to portray Siobhan Ryan Novak on Ryan's Hope, replacing actress Sarah Felder, who originated the role. Gillespie played the role for one year before she was replaced by Marg Helgenberger. In 1984, she appeared in a pilot, The Sheriff and the Astronaut, opposite Alec Baldwin. She made guest-starring appearances in T.J. Hooker, Hotel, Happy Days, Matlock, and Star Trek: The Next Generation. She also appeared in a made-for-television movies Living Proof: The Hank Williams, Jr. Story (1983), Kenny Rogers as The Gambler: The Adventure Continues (1984), Kenny Rogers as The Gambler, Part III: The Legend Continues (1987) and The Gambler Returns: The Luck of the Draw (1991).

Gillespie is perhaps best known for her recurring role as Jackie Taylor, mother to Kelly Taylor, appearing in 26 episodes over the 10 seasons (1990–2000) of Fox teen drama series, Beverly Hills, 90210. She reprised her role in 6 episodes over the first two seasons (2008–2009) of the relaunched 90210, as mother to both Kelly and Erin. She also had a recurring role of Nurse Jabara in Star Trek: Deep Space Nine from 1993 to 1995, and as Shelly Thomas on NBC daytime soap opera, Sunset Beach in 1999. Gillespie also appeared in one episode of the first season of Gilmore Girls, playing Paris Geller's mother. Her other guest-starring credits include 7th Heaven, ER, The Practice and Judging Amy. She also appeared in films Lovesick (1983), Rich Girl (1991), and Valerie Flake (1999).

In 2003, Gillespie earned her B.A. at Goddard College in Vermont. She has two children. She later received MFA in creative writing through Seattle Pacific University.
