= Melissa Rossi =

American author and journalist

Melissa Rossi (born in Dayton, Ohio) is an American author and journalist who writes about subjects such as climate change, the history of current events, and international geopolitical situations. In addition to her books, Rossi's work has been published in Yahoo! News, Washington Post, AARP, Newsweek, MSNBC, Newsday, Esquire, the New York Observer and National Geographic Traveler, where she wrote a regular column.

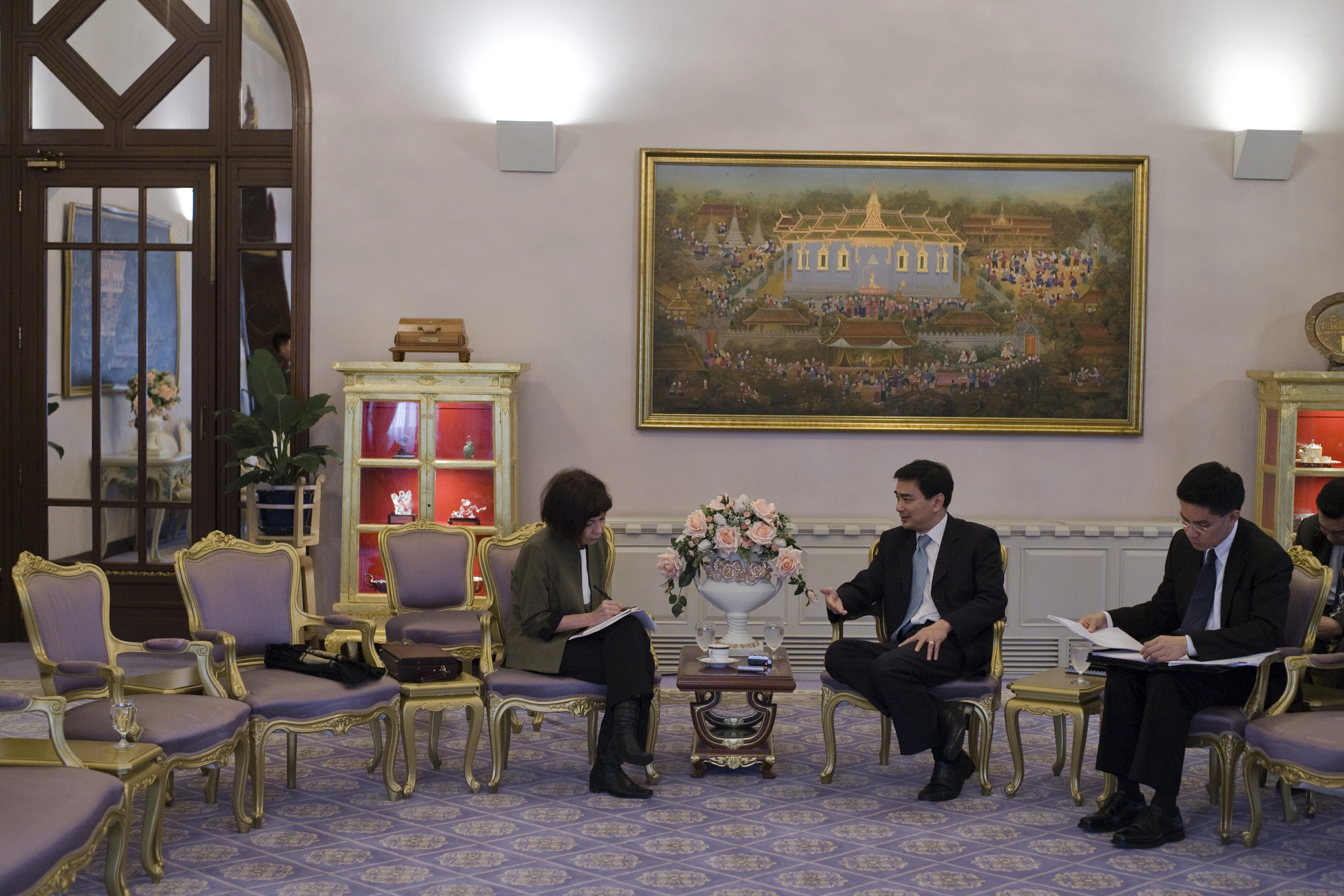

== Early life ==
Rossi grew up moving all around the United States. She has lived in Seattle, Washington, New York, Vermont, Florida, Iowa, and Ohio. After writing a biography of Courtney Love, she decided she wanted to travel the world. She visited most European countries and has also lived in Thailand, Spain, Italy, the Netherlands, and Belgium.

Rossi grew up wanting to be a visual artist; however, she has no skills.

== Books ==
- What Every American Should Know About the Middle East (2008)
- What Every American Should Know About Who's Really Running America and what you can do about it (2007; ISBN 0452288207)
- What Every American Should Know About Europe: The Hotspots, Hotshots, Political Muck Ups, Cross-Border Sniping and Cultural Chaos of our Transatlantic Cousins (2006; ISBN 0-452-28776-6)
- What Every American Should Know About Who's Really Running the World: The People, Corporations and Organizations that Control Our Future (2005; ISBN 0-452-28615-8)
- What Every American Should Know About the Rest of the World: Your Guide to Today's Hotspots, Hotshots and Incendiary Issues (2003; ISBN 0-452-28405-8)
- Courtney Love: Queen of Noise (1996; ISBN 0-671-00038-1)
- Freak like Me: Inside the Jim Rose Circus Sideshow (1995; ISBN 0-440-50744-8)
