= Elaine Davidson =

Brazilian woman known for body piercing

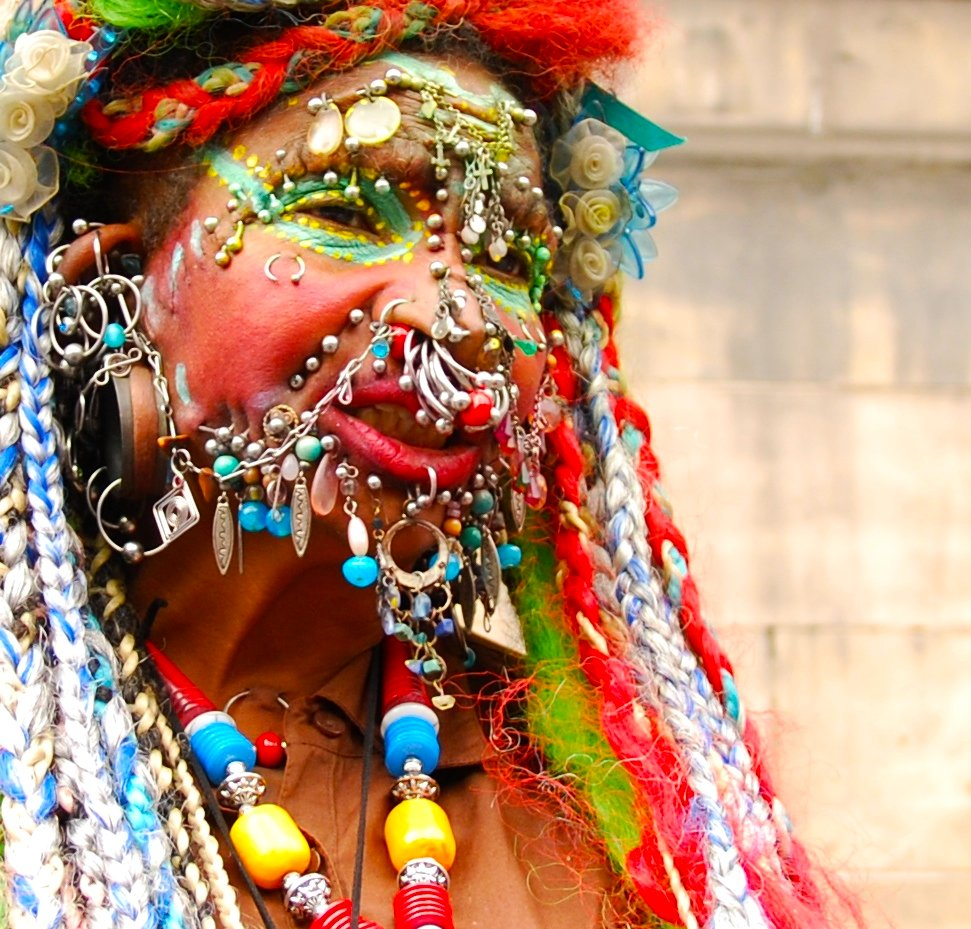
- Davidson in 2009
- Born: Rio de Janeiro, Brazil
- Other name: World's Most Pierced Woman
- Occupation: Performer
- Known for: Extensive body piercings
- Spouse: Douglas Watson (m. 2011; div. 2012)
- Website: elainedavidson.co.uk

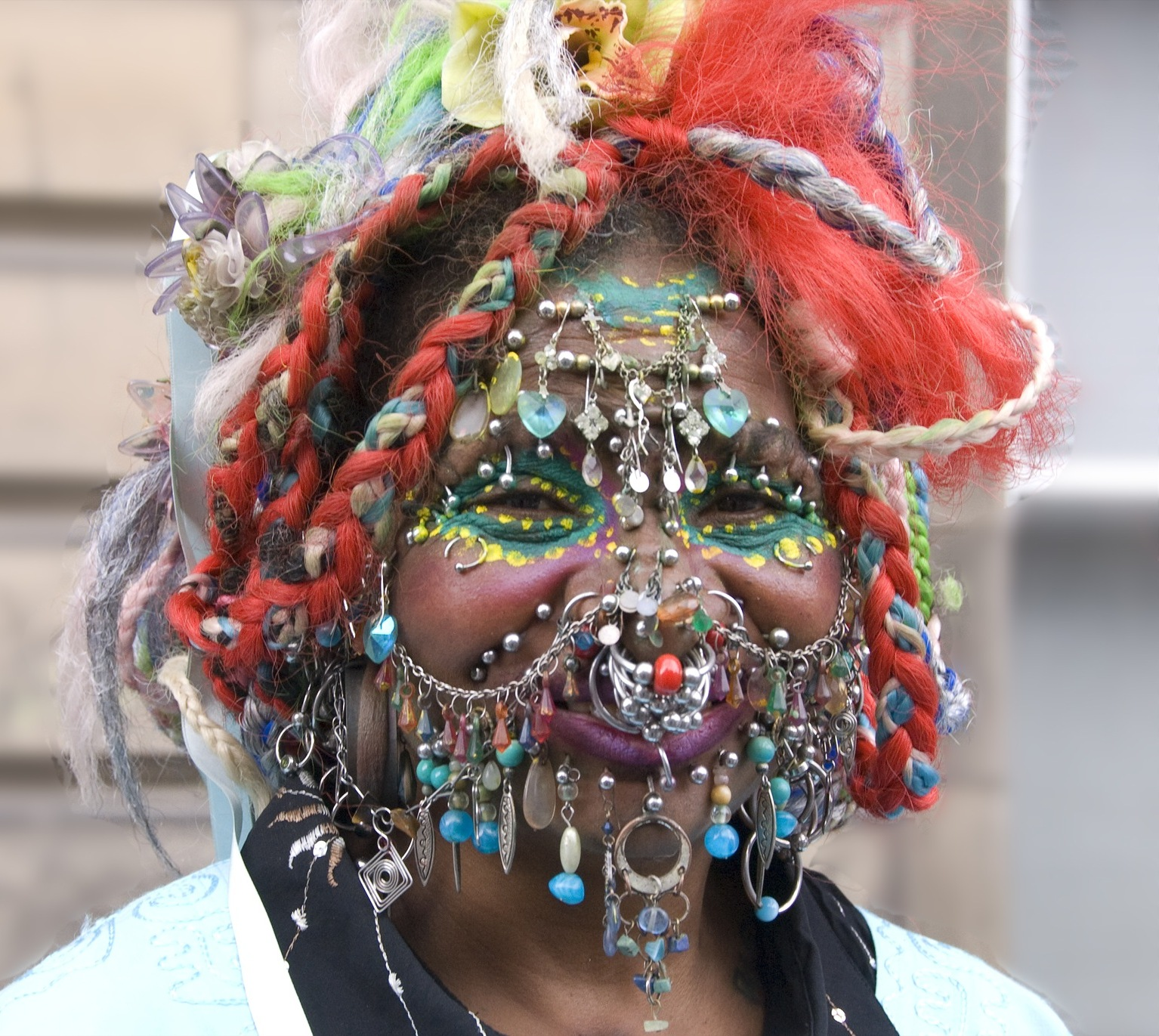
Davidson in 2015

Elaine Davidson is a Brazilian-Scottish former nurse, based in Edinburgh who Guinness World Records has certified as the "Most Pierced Woman".

== Guinness World Records ==
When examined by a Guinness World Record official in May 2000, Davidson had 462 piercings, with 192 in her face alone. By 9 August 2001 when she was re-examined she was found to have 720 piercings. Performing at the Edinburgh Festival in 2005, The Guardian reported that she now had 3,950 body piercings. As of 2003, she had more piercings in her genitalia than in any other part of the body – 500 in all, externally and internally.

Because of her dedication to the art form, Guinness World Records recognised her with a lifetime record of 4225 piercings for the title of "Most Piercings in a lifetime (female)." The total weight of her internal piercings is estimated to be about 3 kilograms. As of February 2009 her piercings totaled 6,005. In a 2023 interview on ITV's This Morning with Dermot O'Leary and Alison Hammond, Davidson shared her goal to one day reach 20,000 piercings in total. Davidson was also featured in 'Guinness World Records: The Board Game.'

Year	Record	Achievement
2000	The World's Most Pierced Woman	Most Piercings
2003	Guinness Lifetime record	Most Piercings in a lifetime (Female)
2012	Heaviest Weight pulled With Tongue (Female)	Heaviest weight pulled via pierced tongue
2012	Most Skewers Through Tongue	Most skewers pushed though tongue piercing

== Divination ==
Since the late 1990s, Elaine has been engaged in the practice of divination and clairvoyance. She is available for hire for private tarot card readings, crystal ball readings, palmistry, rune stone readings and the study of patterns found in tea leaves, a practice known as 'tasseography'.

== Books ==
Davidson has appeared in several Guinness World Record books including 2003, 2016, 2017, 2018, 2022 and 'The Stories Behind The Records: Amazing Body Records'. She was also featured in the 2005 'Planet Eccentric' and 2015 'Impossibly Amazing' Ripley’s Believe It or Not! books.

In 2024 she teamed up with Johnny Strange to release an official biography, the book is titled 'Elaine Davidson: Holier Than Thou' and talks all about her life and career as a performer.

== TV shows ==
Davidson has been featured in many documentaries and TV shows such as Guinness World Records, Lo Show Dei Record, MTV’s Senseless, Ripley’s believe It or Not!, PIERCED, and National Geographic’s Taboo. She has also been featured in many videos by YouTube personalities such as The Sidemen, That’s Interesting and The Young Turks.

== See also ==
- Body modification
