= Katzen (performer) =

Performance artist and tattoo artist

- Occupations: performance artist, tattoo artist
- Known for: extensive body modifications to look like a cat

Katzen the Tiger Lady, or Katzen Hobbes, is a female performance artist and tattoo artist, whose full body tattoo theme is that of a tiger. Katzen is the German word for cats.

== Tattooing ==
She received extensive tattooing on all parts of her body and wore tiger whiskers attached via piercings on her face. Most of the feline tattooing occurred between the ages of 18 and 28. More than 227 different tattoo artists have tattooed her, including 23 at one time. Katzen removed her plastic whiskers after 14 years of wear because she started to feel that they affected her field of vision.

Katzen was married to The Enigma, with whom she performed in a band called The Human Marvels before their divorce.

== See also ==
- Stalking Cat
- The Lizardman (performer)
- Tom Leppard
