= Steve Balderson =

American film director

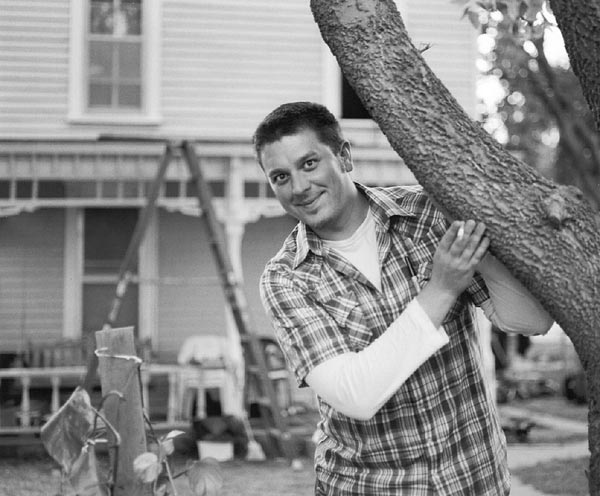
- Steve Balderson circa 2003
- Born: January 19, 1975 (age 51); Manhattan, Kansas
- Occupation: Film director
- Website: stevebalderson.com

Stephen Clark Balderson (born January 19, 1975) is an American film director.

== Early life ==
Balderson was born in Manhattan, Kansas, and raised in nearby Wamego, Kansas, until the age of twelve, when his family moved to Manhattan. Balderson attended Manhattan High School." Balderson attended film school at California Institute of the Arts, where he directed six full-length digital movies, including a screen adaptation of Anne Rice's novel The Vampire Lestat. At the end of his third year at CalArts, Balderson realized he'd never had a mid-residency review. When he asked his dean, Hartmut Bitomsky, Bitomsky answered, "Master's students don't have mid-residency reviews." When Bitomsky learned Balderson was an undergrad, he instructed Balderson to stop going to his classes and instead, to do independent study with him. Once a week the two would meet and dissect Alfred Hitchcock films and Steve learned how to focus his vision. After months of working one-on-one with his dean, Balderson decided he was ready to leave CalArts without graduating.

== Films ==
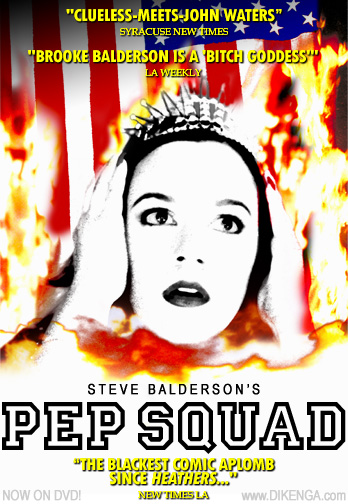

- Pep Squad: After leaving CalArts in 1996, Balderson returned to Kansas and directed his debut feature film. Pep Squad satirized and predicted American school violence prior to the horrific series of school shootings. In November 2009, Balderson sold distribution rights for Pep Squad to his mentor Lloyd Kaufman. Kaufman's company Troma Entertainment will handle the DVD re-release.
- Firecracker: Firecracker, was released theatrically in 2005 to sold-out audiences in a first-ever "Freak Show Tour" supervised by Landmark Theatres, the nation's largest art house chain. Film critic Roger Ebert called it "Brilliant" and gave Firecracker a Special Jury Award on his list of the year's best films. Film Threat called the film a "masterpiece" that is "told by a story teller who has a nascent finger on the pulse of contemporary cinema," Firecracker features the acting debut of alternative music icon Mike Patton and the critically acclaimed comeback of Academy Award nominee Karen Black. Also starring are Susan Traylor, Pleasant Gehman, Jane Wiedlin, Selene Luna, The Enigma, George the Giant, Jak Kendall, Brooke Balderson (Steve's sister), Amy Kelly, and Lobster Girl Cathy Berry, daughter of Lobster Boy Grady Stiles. Firecracker premiered at London's Raindance Film Festival, where it won a Jury Prize nomination for Best Picture. It also won numerous awards on the festival circuit worldwide including: Best Picture, Best Cinematography, Best Actress for Karen Black, and Steve Balderson won the 2005 Domani Vision Award for emerging talent at Tribeca's Visionfest.
- Watch Out: Watch Out is based on a novel of the same name by Joseph Suglia. Watch Out is the story of Jonathan Barrows, a man who falls in love with himself. He is attracted to his own body, carries out an erotic relationship with a blow-up doll that resembles him, and takes pleasure in rejecting the advances of male and female admirers. He descends into a world of carnivorous priests and Prozac-popping Polish prostitutes and eventually assassinates the world's most popular pop diva. The film was shot without permits on location in Kansas. Starring Matt Riddlehoover and co-starring Peter Stickles (Shortbus), B-movie actor Jeff Dylan Graham, Amy Kelly, Jon Niccum and burlesque performer Lady Monster. Watch Out premiered at the Raindance Film Festival in London. It was released theatrically in the "Stop Turning Me On" world tour in New York (Coney Island Film Festival), Nashville, Chicago, Washington D.C (Reel Affirmations Festival), Seattle (Lesbian & Gay Film Festival), San Francisco, Asheville, Charlottesville (Virginia Film Festival), Kansas City, Lawrence KS, Austin (Alamo Drafthouse), and Los Angeles.
- Stuck!: Stuck! is Balderson's homage to film noir women-in-prison films. The movie, photographed in black and white, was produced in Macon, Georgia, during April and May 2009. The film stars Karen Black, Susan Traylor, Jane Wiedlin, Mink Stole, Stacy Cunningham, Starina Johnson and Pleasant Gehman. It's the story of Daisy, an innocent young woman framed for killing her mother. Condemned by the press and the public, Daisy is found guilty of murder and sentenced to die by hanging. The screen play was written by Frankie Krainz. Stuck! premiered at the 2009 Raindance Film Festival in London, England. Currently on the festival circuit, the film is an official selection of the following film festivals: Skeive Filmer in Oslo Norway; The Southwest Gay and Lesbian Film Festival; The Seattle Lesbian & Gay Film Festival; 2009's REELING (the Chicago GLBT Film Festival), 2010 Macon Film Festival and the 2010 Boston Underground Film Festival. On February 3, 2010, Stuck! premiered at Grauman's Egyptian Theatre in Los Angeles. The special event was hosted by the American Cinematheque. The after party and dinner was held at Musso & Frank Grill.
- The Casserole Club: The film stars Susan Traylor, Jane Wiedlin, Kevin Richardson, Daniel Sea, Michael Maize, Starina Johnson, Garrett Swann and Pleasant Gehman, among others. It was filmed in the fall of 2010 on location in Wamego, Kansas and Indio, California. The screen play was written by Frankie Krainz. The film premiered in New York City at Visionfest`11 in June collecting 9 Independent Vision Award nominations and winning 5 for Best Picture, Best Director, Best Actor for Kevin Richardson, Best Actress for Susan Traylor, and Best Production Design for Steve Balderson. The other award nominations were Best Writing for Frankie Krainz, Best Original Score for Rob Kleiner, The Jack Nance Breakthrough Performance Award for Jennifer Grace, and The Abe Schrager Award for Cinematography for Steve Balderson.
- Culture Shock: This was the third collaboration between Steve and screenwriter Frankie Krainz. The film was produced in October 2011 entirely without permits in Kansas City and in London, England. The story centers around four twenty-somethings, played by Starina Johnson, Mark Booker, Nic Roewert and Holly Hinton who travel to the UK for a backpacking holiday only to be caught up in a murder. They are followed by a detective, played by Damien Gerard, who is trying to solve the case. However, all is not as it seems.
- Far Flung Star: The fourth collaboration between Steve and screenwriter Frankie Krainz. The film was produced in early 2013 on location in Los Angeles and Hong Kong. It premiered at the Raindance Film Festival in 2013. The film is an action-adventure and was released exclusively on Vimeo.
- Occupying Ed: Filmed in 2013, Occupying Ed is the first collaboration between Balderson and screenwriter Jim Lair Beard. The film premiered at London's Raindance Film Festival in 2014.
- Hell Town: Co-directed with Texas native Elizabeth Spear, Hell Town is a melodrama and soap opera style horror film. Was released in limited theaters on Aug 23, 2016.
- El Ganzo: Produced entirely on location in Los Cabos, Mexico, in 2014, the experimental drama stars Susan Traylor, Anslem Richardson and Mark Booker. El Ganzo was winner of Best Film, Best Actor, and Best Cinematography at the Salento International Film Fest and was released in limited theaters in the US on September 9, 2016
- The Wamego Trilogy: Wamego was a three-part documentary series. Wamego: Making Movies Anywhere was released in 2004 on DVD, Making Movies Anywhere won Best Film at the 2005 Fox Film Festival and the 2004 Kan Festival Award. Wamego Strikes Back, the sequel to Making Movies Anywhere, was released in 2007. The third installment, Wamego: Ultimatum chronicles the making of Watch Out. To celebrate its 10-year anniversary, Wamego: Making Movies Anywhere was re-released on Vimeo in September 2014.
- Alchemy of the Spirit: Dark gothic supernatural love story starring Xander Berkeley, Sarah Clarke, Whip Hubley, and Mink Stole. About a man (Berkeley) who wakes up to find his wife has died during the night. Film Threat says, "9/10...it is an intimate journey that Balderson makes haunting, beautiful, and extraordinary. Berkeley’s acting is without flaw."
- Bloody Famous: TV mini-series celebrating the extremes people go for fame and love, the show blends “Bachelorette” with “Hunger Games.” Each season, a bachelor or bachelorette leads a dangerous dating show where love is a high-stakes game – elimination equals death.
- Brainstare: The film is a psychological science-fictional thriller based on the play by Joseph Suglia that explores the conflict between human consciousness and machine intelligence in a corporate world where human memories and thoughts can be scanned and sold. Brainstare pushes the boundaries of what a "feature film" can be: given that it's "live action" only in the sense that it simulates a realistic human-based movie - but every element is produced via AI. That makes it arguably the first of its kind, at least on record. The director (Steve Balderson) said the choice was driven by curiosity, and the desire to see whether a full-length film could exist - and remain coherent - when built entirely with AI. He described the result as "incredibly hands-on – more like sculpting than simply typing words into a machine."

== Filmography ==
=== Film director ===
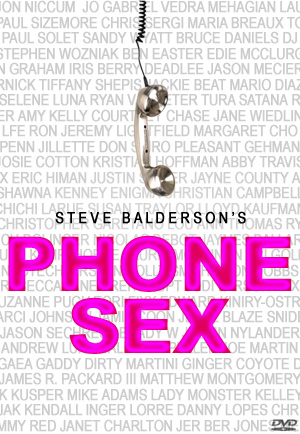
Phone Sex movie poster

- Brainstare (feature, 2025)
- Sex Love Venice (feature, 2025)
- Bloody Famous (TV mini-series, 2024)
- Alchemy of the Spirit (feature, 2022)
- Elvis Lives (feature, 2017)
- El Ganzo (feature, 2015)
- Hell Town (feature, 2015)
- Occupying Ed (feature, 2014)
- The Far Flung Star (feature, 2014)
- Culture Shock (feature, 2013)
- The Casserole Club (feature, 2011)
- Stuck! (feature, 2010)
- Wamego: Ultimatum (documentary feature, 2009)
- Watch Out (feature, 2009)
- Underbelly (documentary feature, 2008)
- Wamego Strikes Back (documentary feature, 2007)
- Phone Sex (feature, HD, 2006)
- Firecracker (feature, Super 35mm film, 2005)
- Wamego: Making Movies Anywhere (documentary feature, 2004)
- Pep Squad (feature 35mm film, 1998)
- Eleven Eleven (feature digital film, 1996)
- Pep Squad (feature digital film, 1995)
- By the Light of the Moon (digital feature film, 1994)
- Children of Darkness/The Vampire Lestat (digital feature film, 1993)
- Videorotica (music video, 1992)
- Bus Stop Goodbyes (video feature film, 1992)
- The Visionaries (video feature film, 1991)

== Awards ==
- Winner Best Screenplay - Festival Cine Del Mar 2022 (Alchemy of the Spirit)
- Winner Best Sci-Fi Feature Film - Seattle Film Festival 2022 (Alchemy of the Spirit)
- Winner Best Feature Film - Philadelphia Independent Film Festival 2022 (Alchemy of the Spirit)
- Winner Best Director - Atlanta Underground Film Festival 2022 (Alchemy of the Spirit)
- Winner Best Cinematography - Crimson Screen Film Festival 2022 (Alchemy of the Spirit)
- Winner Best Art/Experimental Feature Film - Another Hole in the Head Film Festival 2022 (Alchemy of the Spirit)
- Nomination Best Feature Film - Fantasporto Film Festival 2022 (Alchemy of the Spirit)
- Nomination Best Feature Film - Salento International Film Festival 2022 (Alchemy of the Spirit)
- Winner Best Feature Film Award - Salento International Film Festival 2015 Italy (El Ganzo)
- Winner Best Cinematography Award - Salento International Film Festival 2015 Italy (El Ganzo)
- Winner Best Feature Film - Colorado HorrorCon USA 2015 (Hell Town)
- Winner Best Feature Film - Crimson Screen Film Fest USA 2015 (Hell Town)
- Winner Best Director Independent Vision Awards - Visionfest 2011 (The Casserole Club)
- Winner Best Picture Independent Vision Awards - Visionfest 2011 (The Casserole Club)
- Winner Best Production Design Independent Vision Awards - Visionfest 2011 (The Casserole Club)
- Winner Special Jury Award - Roger Ebert's Best Films of the Year 2005 (Firecracker)
- Winner Independent Filmmaker Award - KAN Film Festival 2004 (Wamego: Making Movies Anywhere)
- Winner Killer-B Award Best Screenplay 2000 B-Movie Film Festival (Pep Squad)
- Nominated Best International Feature Film - Raindance Film Festival 2008 (Watch Out)
- Nominated Best International Feature Film - Fantasporto 2005 (Firecracker)
