= Silver Tongue =

Silver tongue may refer to:

== Art and literature ==
- Silvertongue, the third book in Charlie Fletcher's Stoneheart trilogy
- Silvertongue, the lawyer in Hogarth's prints Marriage à-la-mode
- Silvertongue, a nickname for Mortimer Folchart in Cornelia Funke's Inkheart series
- Silvertongue, the surname earned by Lyra Belacqua in Philip Pullman's His Dark Materials

== Films ==
- Silver Tongues (film), a 2011 film by Simon Arthur

== Music ==
- Silver Tongue (album), a 2020 album by Torres
- Silver Tongues (song), a song by Louis Tomlinson
- "Silver Tongue", a song by Humble Pie from their 1969 album Town and Country
- "Silver Tongue", a song by Sonata Arctica from their 2003 album Winterheart's Guild
- "Silver Tongue", a song by Deep Purple from their 2003 album Bananas
- "Silvertongue", a song by Young the Giant from their 2016 album Home of the Strange
- "Silver Tongue", a song by Alter Bridge from their 2022 album Pawns & Kings
