= Watch Out (film) =

- Directed by: Steve Balderson
- Written by: Steve Balderson
- Based on: Watch Out by Joseph Suglia
- Starring: Matt Riddlehoover
- Music by: Rob Kleiner; David Bagsby
- Release date: October 1, 2008 (Raindance Film Festival)
- Country: United States
- Language: English

Watch Out is a 2008 film directed by Steve Balderson and starring Matt Riddlehoover. It is based on the novel by Joseph Suglia. Though the story is set in Benton Harbor, Michigan, the film was shot guerrilla-style, without permits, in March and April on location in Wamego, Kansas.

The film premiered at the Raindance Film Festival in London, where it was nominated for Best International Feature. It was released theatrically in the "Stop Turning Me On" world tour in New York (Coney Island Film Festival), Nashville, Chicago, Washington D.C (Reel Affirmations Festival), Seattle (Lesbian & Gay Film Festival), San Francisco, Asheville, Charlottesville (Virginia Film Festival), Kansas City, Lawrence KS, Austin (Alamo Drafthouse), and Los Angeles.

== Festivals ==
- 2008 Raindance Film Festival - Nominee Best International Feature
- 2008 8th Annual Coney Island Film Festival
- 2008 Reel Affirmations Film Festival
- 2008 Seattle Lesbian & Gay Film Festival
- 2009 Boston Underground Film Festival
