= Jim Rose Circus =

Modern-day version of a circus sideshow

- Genre: Contemporary circus
- Show type: Sideshow
- Date of premiere: 1990s

Creative team
- Jim Rose: co-founder
- Bebe Rose: co-founder

The Jim Rose Circus is a modern-day version of a circus sideshow. It was founded in Seattle in 1991 by Jim Rose and his wife BeBe Aschard Rose. The sideshow, then called the "Jim Rose Circus Sideshow", came to prominence to an American audience as a second stage show at the 1992 Lollapalooza festival. although they had toured the Northwest and Canada and had several US TV appearances before this time. Rolling Stone magazine called the show an "absolute must-see act" and USA Today termed Rose's troupe "Lollapalooza's word-of-mouth hit attraction".

== Tours ==
In 1994, Jim Rose changed the lineup and dropped "sideshow" from the billing. He toured with Nine Inch Nails, Pop Will Eat Itself and Marilyn Manson. His 1997-98 world tours featured female sumo wrestling, Mexican transvestite wrestling, and chainsaw football. These shows were the pinnacle of the circus's touring career.

== Performers ==
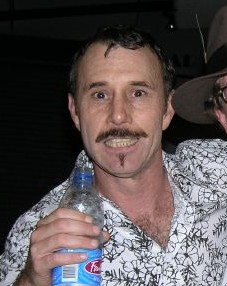
Jim Rose in 2005

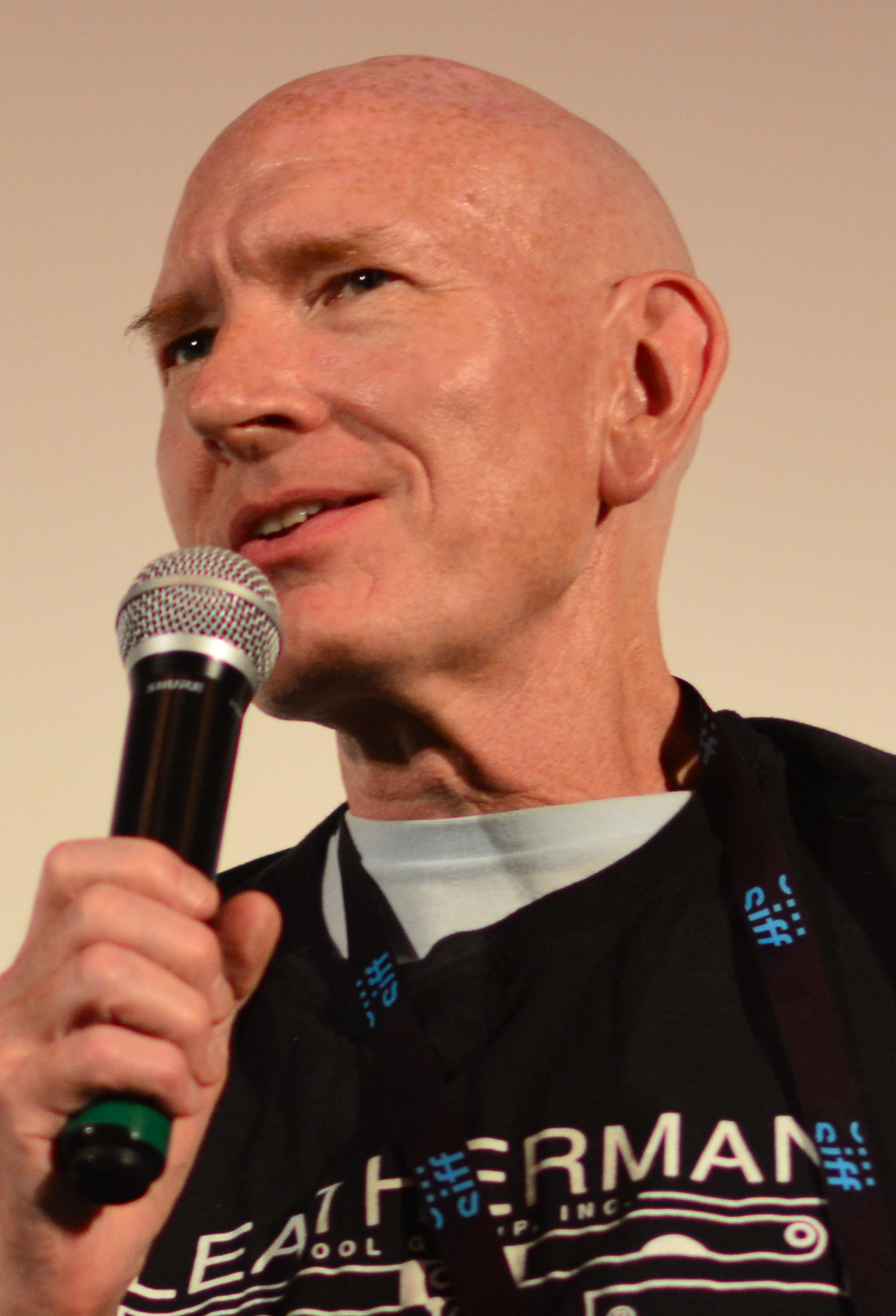
Matt "The Tube" Crowley in 2023

Rose himself performs in between acts, mostly comedy but often stunts as well such as attaching paper currency to his forehead with a staple gun, driving a long nail into his nostril and having darts thrown into his back. During the show's final act, he would escape from a straitjacket. His most outrageous trick followed: he would invite audience members to stand on his head after he had placed it in a shallow crate of broken glass.

- The Amazing Mister Lifto (Joe Hermann) who hung heavy weights (cinder blocks, steam irons, beer kegs, etc.) from his body piercings, including those in his nipples and genitalia. At Lollapalooza Lifto would perform the "genital lift" feat after spraying shaving cream on himself.
- Bebe the Circus Queen (Beatrice Aschard) would perform a variety of stunts such as having a watermelon placed on her back and split with a sword, lying on a bed of nails while weights were placed on her chest... or the "Plastic Bag Of Death", where she gets into a large plastic bag and one of the other performers sucks all of the air out with a vacuum cleaner. She would also employ an electric grinder in her act (for example, she would create a shower of sparks from a metal chastity belt covering her groin area).
- Matt "The Tube" Crowley, whose moniker came from the seven feet of tubing that he would swallow. The other end of the tube was attached to a crude hand pump. Rose himself would fill the pump with a variety of fluids and proceed to pump it into Crowley's stomach, then back out again. Audience members were invited onstage to drink the vile concoction after it had been extricated from Crowley. He would also provide a demonstration of sheer lung power by blowing up a hot water bottle with his mouth until it burst. Other gags included sucking a black condom in through his mouth and out his nose (and reversing the procedure) and working a long piece of plastic fluorescent cord through his nasal passages in order to "floss" his nose.
- Zamora the Torture King (Tim Cridland) had a segment that featured him walking barefoot up and down a ladder of razor sharp sabres, piercing himself with long needles and meat skewers, eating pieces of a broken lightbulb (he would hold a microphone near his mouth so the audience would hear the sound), and touching an electrical generator while holding a fluorescent lightbulb that would glow.
- The Enigma (Paul Lawrence), originally known as Slug, was billed as a man who would eat anything (including slugs, worms, and grasshoppers), and swallow a variety of swords. He also doubled as the show's organ player. His body is completely tattooed with blue jigsaw puzzle pieces.
- The Lizardman performed by Erik Sprague (born 1972) is a completely tattooed performer with a surgically split tongue (featured on Ripley's Believe It or Not) joined Jim in 1999 on the Godsmack Voodoo Tour and in 2001 toured with just Jim and Bebe doing comedy clubs. He performed several acts previously done by members who had left.
- Cappy (David Capurro) is a yoyo artist. Featured in The Jim Rose Twisted Tour.
- Rupert (Ryan Stock) performed the traditional sideshow stunts. He now stars in his own show on the Discovery Channel with partner Amber Lynn.
- John Chaos performs traditional stunts. He later staged his own one-man show, the John Chaos Sideshow, mixing classic and new stunts with offbeat humor and magic tricks. Chaos still performs with the Jim Rose Circus from time to time.
- Jake "the Snake" Roberts
- Sinn Bodhi formally known as Kizarny of the WWE
- Brianna Belladonna, a female sword swallower who performed at Sturgis with the circus in 2010.
- Jimmy Coffin, a working act. Later he toured the US as a solo sideshow artist as the "Jimmy Coffin Sideshow".
- "Fat Matt" Alaeddine, billed as the world's fattest contortionist

== Television and other media ==
Jim Rose and The Enigma were featured in the Season 2 episode of The X-Files, "Humbug".

Homer Simpson joins the Jim Rose Circus as a cannonball catcher (not to be confused with a human cannonball) on the episode "Homerpalooza" of The Simpsons.

2003 - 2005 "The Jim Rose Twisted Tour" a weekly travel show on the Travel Channel

== Publications ==
Jim Rose's autobiography Freak Like Me (Real, Raw, and Dangerous) with journalist Melissa Rossi was published in 1995 (ISBN 9780440507444). The book describes Rose's early years and features a stream of consciousness on-the-road account of the Jim Rose Circus tour with Lollapalooza. The book's title is a reference to Black Like Me.

Rose's book Snake Oil: Life's Calculations, Misdirections, And Manipulations was published in 2005.

== Politics ==
According to an interview with Oddities Magazine, Jim Rose claims to have been involved in fundraising for the Mo Udall political campaign during a time in his life when he was addicted to heroin. He was quoted as stating that "[Mo] ran against Jimmy Carter and I was his fundraiser... I used to do fundraisers with like Gregory Peck and Robert Redford, actually while I was on heroin. They didn’t know... actually I forgot to tell them."

== Reception ==
Rolling Stone described the circus as an "absolute must-see act". The Independent praised the show as "brutally comic", adding that Rose "plays the highly-strung audience like a violin". Melody Maker compared the "revolted amusement" of the audience to that of tourists at a bullfight.

British Circus proprietor Gerry Cottle said, "I've seen a lot of things in my time. I must see 40 circuses a year, but this lot... They came on in their street clothes and then... They're beyond anything I've ever seen. They shocked me." The Times Magazine said that while it may not be everyone's idea of entertainment, it certainly did not deserve to be banned.
