= Hao Lulu =

Chinese cosmetic surgery recipient

Hao Lulu (Chinese: 郝璐璐, born 9 January 1979) is a Manchu Chinese woman who has become well known for having undergone extensive cosmetic surgery in 2003 to alter her appearance, tagged "The Artificial Beauty" (人造美女).

== Biography ==
=== Early years and education ===
Born in Beijing, Hao entered the China University of Geosciences in 1999. After graduation in 2001, she studied for a master's degree in gemology in the United Kingdom until 2003.

=== Career ===
She became a freelance fashion writer briefly until July 19, 2003, to August 14, 2003, when she started a series of operations to modify her eyes, nose, chin, breasts, abdomen, buttocks, legs, and skin, at just 24 years old.

In before-and-after photographs widely circulated in the media, her appearance was indeed radically altered, in particular her eyes, which were given double eyelids to give her a more occidental appearance (see Asian blepharoplasty). The color of her skin was also lightened.

The transformation of Lulu, the "Beauty Dreamwork Project" (治造美人), was organized by EverCare (伊美尔), a Beijing cosmetic surgery clinic, to promote its business, which had been languishing in the aftermath of the SARS epidemic. Evercare organized a press conference around Lulu to promote the company's cosmetic surgery services. The clinic came out with numerous ads that claimed they have the confidence and capacity to help Chinese women create new physiques through the use of advanced technologies and surgical skills. After her surgeries, Hào then worked as a spokesperson for the cosmetic surgery clinic that transformed her body

The company's actions have been criticized in China by doctors, who deplored it as a publicity stunt. However, it led to a great upsurge in interest in cosmetic surgery among China's nouveau riche. After her transformation, news stories on body alternations increased tremendously in China's mainstream media, marginalized tabloids, and cyberspace, from a number of different beauty companies.

== Diary ==
Hao's diary, published on the clinic's website, stated the pain and numbness she felt after certain procedures. She also constantly expressed her wish to go home tomorrow, where "freedom" is. In the second last entry, she concluded, however, that all pain is gone and that it was such a relief: "How wonderful all these things are; I have no regret for my very first choice!" (这一切是多么的美好，我无悔我最初的选择！)
