= Senseless (game show) =

British dating game show

Senseless is a British television dating game show hosted by Tom Price which first aired on MTV UK on 12 June 2006.

On each episode a male or female contestant chooses a date from six potential candidates, ranging from the handsome to the foul. However she/he can only do this by touching and smelling them inside a dark room; the contestant does not see any of the dates until she/he eliminates the last one at the end of the show. At the end the contestant wins a date with somebody that could either be his/her dream partner or his/her worst nightmare.

== Format ==
The contestant goes into a dark room where the six potential dates are waiting. By touching, smelling and tasting the six potential dates, the contestant eliminates each date one by one until one date remains. The viewers get to see the action via infra-red cameras in the dark room.

Challenges in selecting the least favourite date ranges from licking food off each of the date's bodies, sniffing various parts of the date's bodies e.g. belly button, toes, bum crack, being spanked or kissed by each date and deciding which date has the best nipples or penis.

The contestant must, in each round, eliminate one potential date until only one is left at the end. The catch (of which the contestant is unaware) is that the date that the contestant chooses at the end of the show wins £1000. Because of this, some of the dates are competing for the cash and not for the contestant's heart.

The six potential dates are sorted into three groups of two. These groups are:

- Two studs, or hotties, attractive players who are genuinely trying to win the heart of the contestant
- Two duds, or notties, usually ex-partners intent on getting revenge, who are playing only for the money
- Two cruds, or grotties, resident dates who are generally unattractive and repulsive players chosen from the show's in-house selection, some cruds range from transsexuals to the morbidly obese

Furthermore, the winning date does not have to go out with the contestant, and can choose anybody else from the dark room. The result is that if the contestant fails to choose one of the two studs, she will be left with a date with one of the cruds.

== Trivia ==
- Grace Adams-Short, famous for appearing in Big Brother 7, was the first contestant on this show. In this episode, her ex-boyfriend fools her into choosing him and sent her on a date with a cross-dresser.
