= The Scary Guy =

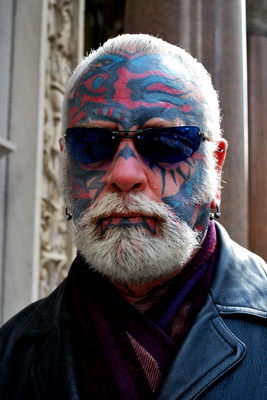
- The Scary Guy in 2011

Background information
- Born: December 29, 1953 (age 72)
- Origin: New Hope, Minnesota, U.S.
- Occupations: Professional speaker, artist, tattoo artist, comedian, entertainer, singer
- Website: thescaryguy.com

The Scary Guy (sometimes stylized THE SCARY GUY; born Earl Kenneth Kaufmann on December 29, 1953) is a United Kingdom-based American motivational speaker who campaigns worldwide to eliminate hate, violence, prejudice, and bullying in schools and corporations. In addition to being a tattoo shop owner, comic, entertainer, inspirational speaker, and performance artist, The Scary Guy has a pierced nose, eyebrows, and ears and covered over 85 percent of his body with tattoos.

== Early life ==
The Scary Guy was born on December 29, 1953, as Earl Kenneth Kaufmann, to his father, Carroll August Kaufmann, and his mother Constance Joan Buckingham. Growing up in New Hope, Minnesota, The Scary Guy graduated in 1972 from Cooper Senior High School and excelled as a voice major at Macalester College, in Saint Paul.

== Tattoos ==
The Scary Guy got his first tattoo at the age of 30 and now has tattoos that cover an estimated 85% of his body. Over the years, his collection has grown as a reflection of his life experiences. They are what he calls, 'modern tribalism', reflecting on various emotional events. One of these is a tattoo of a man called "Yuppiecide", a representation of his former self. Scary Guy's other tattoos represent his love of art and others are chosen simply because The Scary Guy was a computer salesman at one point in his life and they looked "cool".

== Bibliography ==
- Hatwood, Mark David. 7 Days and 7 Nights – An Official Biography of The Scary Guy. VisionHeart, Inc. 2008

== Videos ==
- Teacher's TV – Inspirations Part 1 The Scary Guy on YouTube
- Teacher's TV – Inspirations Part 1 The Scary Guy on YouTube
- Wake Up To Your Powerful Mind on YouTube
- Agent For Change on YouTube
- The Scary Guy Combats Bullying on Teacher's TV on YouTube
- The Scary Guy at Whitecross High School on YouTube
- The Scary Guy on Firepit Friday

== Films ==
- Scary also known as Scary – tattoo therapy, title in German : Scary – Furchterregend (2006) by Uli Kick, Arte, Bayerischer Rundfunk, Filmworks, Südwestrundfunk, Westdeutscher Rundfunk.

== See also ==
- Teachers' TV
