= Diabão Praddo =

Brazilian tattoo artist

- Born: Michel Praddo; 1975 (age 50–51); Santos, São Paulo, Brazil
- Occupation: tattoo artist
- Known for: Body modification
- Spouse: Mulher Demônia (Carol Praddo)

Diabão Praddo (Devil Praddo) is the pseudonym adopted by Brazilian tattoo artist Michel Praddo, who is known for the extreme body modifications he has undergone, including the removal of the ear and the sewing and removal of some fingers, in addition to having more than 80% of his body tattooed. In 2023, he entered Guinness as the man with the most 'horn' shaped implants in his head.

== Body modifications ==
Among the main body modifications carried out by Praddo are silicone implants, scarification, transdermal implants, nose, ear, navel, and nipple removals, a removal of the ring finger, the joining of the middle finger with the index finger, an eyeball tattoo, a tattooed and forked tongue, bifurcation of the sides of the mouth, a chrome dental implant, liposuction and an abdominoplasty.

== Personal life ==
Born Michel Faro Praddo, he lives in Praia Grande, on the coast of São Paulo, and is married to fellow body modifier Carol Prado, known as Mulher Demônia. Praddo says that he is not a follower of any religion, but that he believes in God and sees himself as a spiritual person.

In April 2024, he got the right to legally change his name to Diabão Faro do Prado, both adopting his pseudonym as his name and changing the spelling of his surname to the more common variant, Prado. Diabão says he changed his name because he "realized he wasn't the same person anymore". "Michel was a person who abandoned his father in the hospital until he died, and then I learned that there is a pain greater than longing, which is remorse. Diabão is the person who took care of a neighbor, an old lady who at first showed fear, but later became my 'granny'."
