= Mind over matter =

Phrase used spiritual doctrines, parapsychology, and philosophy

"Mind over matter" is a phrase that has been used in several contexts, such as mind-centric spiritual doctrines, parapsychology, and philosophy.

Merriam-Webster Dictionary defines mind as "the element or complex of elements in an individual that feels, perceives, thinks, wills, and especially reasons" and mind over matter as "a situation in which someone is able to control a physical condition, problem, etc., by using the mind".

== Origin ==
The phrase "mind over matter" first appeared in 1863 in The Geological Evidence of the Antiquity of Man by Sir Charles Lyell (1797–1875) and was first used to refer to the increasing status and evolutionary growth of the minds of animals and man throughout Earth history.

It may be said that, so far from having a materialistic tendency, the supposed introduction into the earth at successive geological periods of life — sensation, instinct, the intelligence of the higher mammalia bordering on reason, and lastly, the improvable reason of Man himself — presents us with a picture of the ever-increasing dominion of mind over matter.

— Sir Charles Lyell, 1863

Another related saying, "the mind drives the mass" (Latin: mens agitat molem), was coined almost two millennia earlier, in 19 BC, by the poet Virgil in his work Aeneid, book 6, line 727.

== Parapsychology ==
In the field of parapsychology, the phrase has been used to describe paranormal phenomena such as psychokinesis.

== Mao Zedong ==
"Mind over matter" was also Mao Zedong's idea that rural peasants could be "proletarianized" so they could lead the revolution and China could move from feudalism to socialism through New Democracy. According to some, it departs from Leninism in that the revolutionaries are peasants, instead of the urban proletariat.

== Controlling pain ==
The phrase also relates to the ability to control the perception of pain that one may or may not be experiencing.
