= Lucky Diamond Rich =

New Zealand-British stunt performer and world record holder

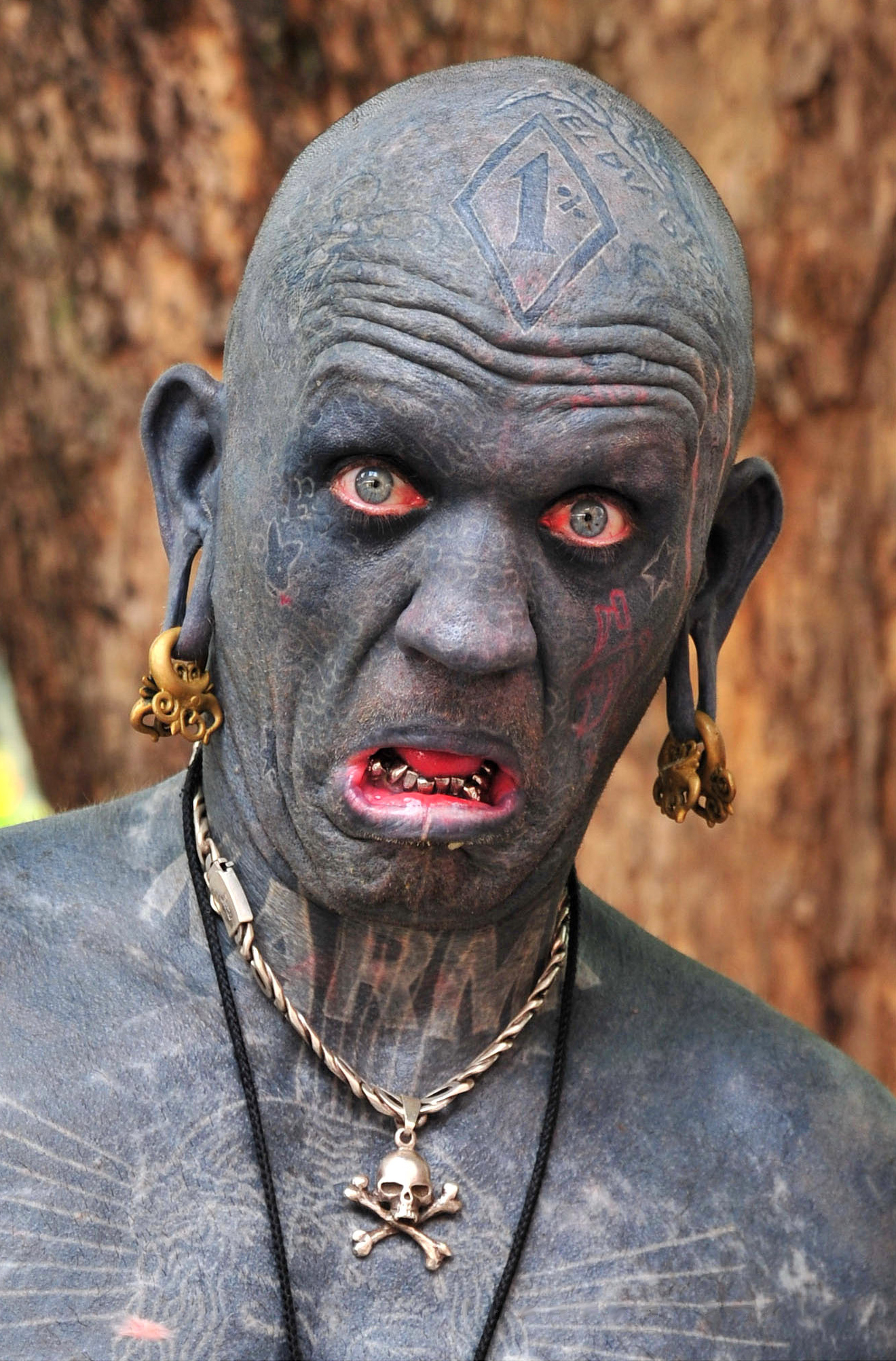
- Lucky Diamond Rich in 2009
- Born: Gregory Paul McLaren; 1971 (age 54–55); New Zealand
- Occupations: Tattoo artist; Performance artist; street performer; performer at the International Arts Festival
- Known for: World's most tattooed person

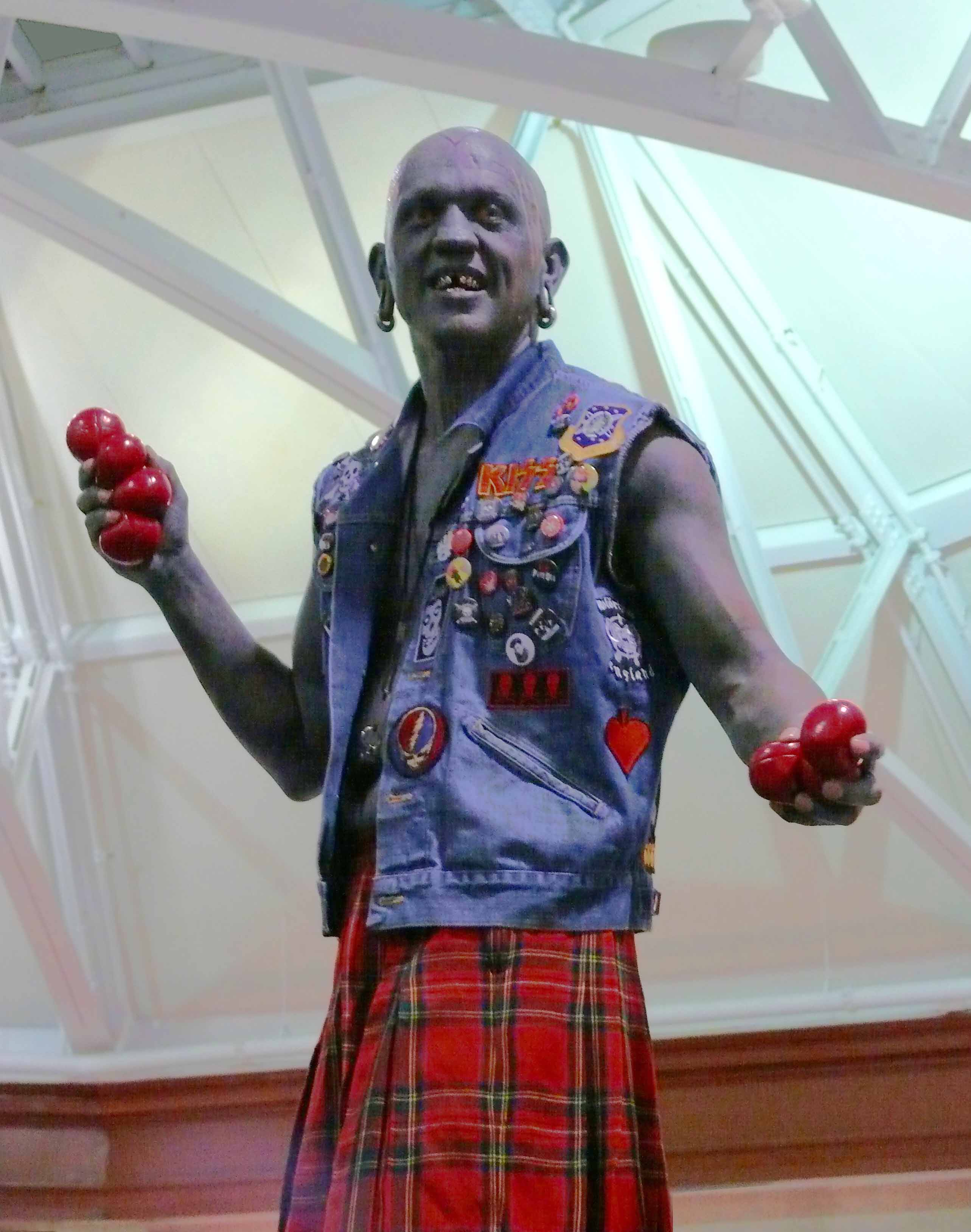
Lucky Diamond Rich pictured at Montreal, Canada's PuSh International Performing Arts Festival in 2008

Gregory Paul McLaren (born 1971), who goes by the name of Lucky Diamond Rich, is a New Zealand-British performance artist, street performer and international performing arts festival performer, whose acts include sword swallowing and juggling on a unicycle.

He is best known, however, for holding the Guinness World Record as "the world's most tattooed person", a title formerly held by Englishman Tom Leppard. Rich has tattoos covering his entire body, including the insides of his eyelids, mouth, ears and foreskin. He has held the certified record since 2006, being 100 per cent tattooed.

== Inspiration and fulfilment ==
As a young boy, he read about and became interested in the most tattooed men and women. It did not go much further than just a thought until he got his first tattoo, which was of a small juggling club on his hip.

He went on to tattoo his entire body, including crevices. He has tattooed some white over his black tattoos and added colour. His tattoos have collectively taken over a thousand hours to ink, and have been worked on by hundreds of tattoo artists.

In adulthood, McLaren discovered that he has Quandamooka and Mununjali ancestry. Following this, he became involved in Indigenous community work in Victoria, volunteering as a support worker at the Galiamble Men’s Alcohol and Drug Recovery Centre, where he assisted Aboriginal men in recovery from substance use.

== See also ==
- Body suit (tattoo)
- Tattoo art style
