= Split tongue =

Intentional or congenital split tongue

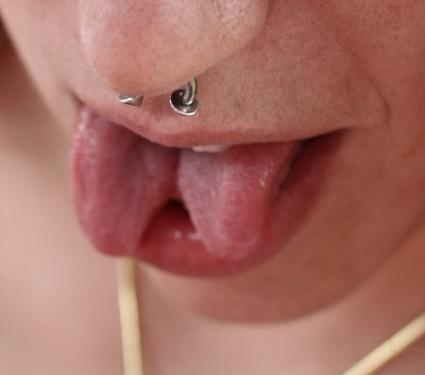
Person with a tongue bifurcation body modification

Video of someone moving a split tongue

Split tongue, tongue bifurcation, splitting or forking, can be a type of body modification in which the tongue is cut centrally from its tip to as far back as the underside base, forking the end; or can be a complication of tongue piercing and various rare congenital malformations.

== Practice ==
Deliberate tongue splitting is a cosmetic body modification procedure that results in a ‘lizard-like’ bifid tongue. Tongue bifurcation has also been reported as an unintended complication of tongue piercing.

=== Process ===
Tongue bifurcation may be done surgically using a scalpel, or cauterised with a laser.

The tongue generally heals in 1–2 weeks, during which time the person may have difficulty with speech or their normal dietary habits. Splitting may be reversed surgically by removal of sutures, excision of healed tissue on edges, and re-suturing the tongue together.

=== Complications ===
Surgical tongue splitting may result in inflammation, bleeding (including hemorrhage), infection, and injury to nerves or arteries on the tongue.

A bifurcated tongue may also perceptibly alter fricative production. Resulting scar tissue may also affect speech.

=== Motivation ===
Proponents of body modifications such as tongue bifurcation may feel that body modification leads to a sense of strength and empowerment, assists pair or group bonding, or promotes emotional recovery from trauma. Proponents may simply like the appearance, considering it beautiful, enjoy the novelty or shock value, or believe it leads to increased sensation or enhancement when kissing. Challenging oneself, rites of passage, connecting with or being in control of one's body, making a spiritual connection or testing the body's limits are also reasons given. Like all body modifications, it can be used to connect or identify with a specific group or to ward off those who would make quick undesired judgments based on appearance.

=== Legality ===
The legality of tongue splitting varies greatly depending on the country and within those countries, individual states or territories. Some examples are given below, but do not encompass all the laws regarding this subject.

==== United States of America ====
Some branches of the U.S. military ban body modifications that detract from a professional military image and explicitly include tongue splitting or forking as examples.

In 2003, Illinois became the first state in the U.S. to regulate tongue splitting, passing a law making it illegal to perform the procedure on another person, unless it is done by someone licensed to practice medicine. The law does not appear to prohibit performing the procedure on one's self. Since then New York, Delaware, and Texas have enacted laws that either ban the practice, ban the procedure on minors without parental consent, or restrict it to being performed by only doctors and/or dentists.

==== Australia ====
In 2009, the Australian state of Victoria enacted a ban on splitting the tongues of minors.

==== United Kingdom ====
In 2017 Brendan McCarthy was charged in the United Kingdom for a number of body modifications including tongue splitting. He pleaded guilty in 2019 to causing grievous bodily harm with intent.

Cases of body modification artists illegally possessing and injecting local anaesthetics for tongue bifurcation procedures have also been recorded in England.

In March 2018, the Court of Appeal ruled tongue splitting to be illegal in England and Wales when performed by a body modification practitioner for cosmetic purposes.

== Notable cases ==
Dustin Allor, a 19-year-old body piercer in the U.S., split her tongue herself in 1996. Not having any reference of this being done before, she came up with the tie-off or fishing line method. In 1997 she was featured on the cover of Fakir Musafar's Body Play Magazine.

A sideshow performer named Erik Sprague, known professionally as The Lizardman, had his tongue split on July 18, 1997. His procedure was performed by oral surgeon Dr. Lawrence Busino, using an argon laser, in what was the first truly professional tongue split. A new deeper split was done on October 3, 1997. This was the third modern tongue bifurcation and the first one done using a laser. Around the same time, a 28-year-old woman performed the same procedure in New York.

== Congenital ==
Bifid tongue in humans may be an unintended complication of tongue piercings or a rare congenital malformation associated with maternal diabetes, orofaciodigital syndrome 1, Ellis–Van Creveld syndrome, Goldenhar syndrome, and Klippel–Feil syndrome.

== See also ==
- Forked tongue
