= The Enigma (performer) =

American actor and musician

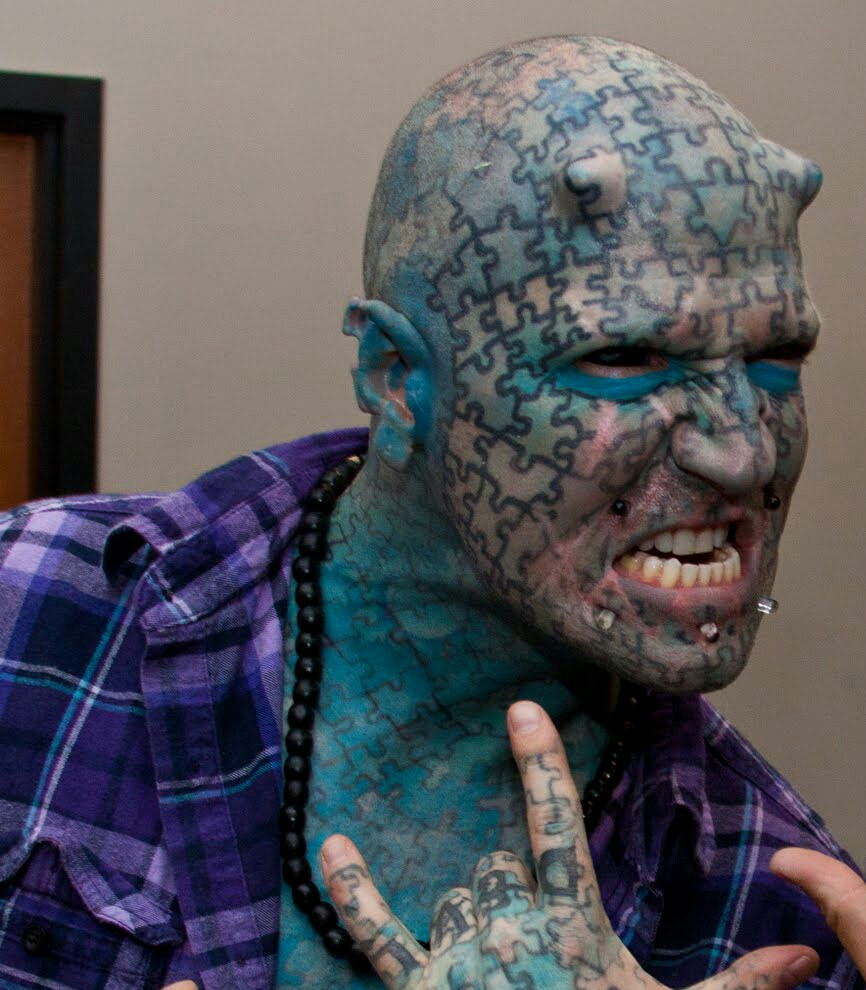
- The Enigma in 2018
- Born: Paul Lawrence; Long Beach, California, United States
- Occupations: Performer, actor, musician
- Known for: Extensive body modifications

The Enigma (born Paul Lawrence) is an American sideshow performer, actor, and musician who has undergone extensive body modification, including horn implants, ear reshaping, multiple body piercings, and a full-body jigsaw-puzzle tattoo. His tattooing process began on December 20, 1992, under the needle of Katzen the Tiger Lady, whom he later married, and has since divorced. To date, the Enigma has had more than two hundred tattoo artists work on him, with as many as twenty-three tattoos underway at one time.

== Early life ==
Paul Lawrence was born in Long Beach, California, and was raised in Seattle, Washington. Lawrence began studying music at the age of six. As a child, he received classical piano and dance training, later describing his upbringing as a "blue-collar Juilliard" education.

== Tattoos and body modification ==
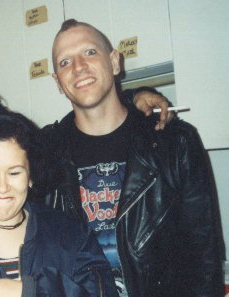
Paul Lawrence in late 1992, before his transformation

In late 1992, Lawrence conceived the full-body jigsaw puzzle tattoo that would become the centrepiece of his body modification. He conceived the design as a single work of art and began the project on December 20, 1992, under tattoo artist and sideshow performer Katzen the Tiger Lady, before undergoing an intensive month-long series of tattooing beginning in January 1993. Looking back on the experience, he recalled, "It was a hard month. There were a lot of intense feelings."

After adopting the stage name The Enigma, he continued developing the artwork over the following three decades. The tattoo gradually expanded to cover nearly his entire body, including his scalp, neck, torso, arms and legs. Thousands of individual jigsaw puzzle pieces, filled predominantly with blue ink, give his skin an overall blue appearance. His body modifications also include two horn-shaped silicone implants beneath the skin of his forehead, surgically reshaped ears, black tattooed sclerae, and five flesh tunnels surrounding his mouth.

More than 200 tattoo artists have contributed to the project, with as many as 23 artists tattooing him simultaneously during tattoo conventions. Because sunlight gradually fades the blue pigment, the tattoo requires continual restoration. The Enigma has compared the ongoing process to "painting a barn with a toothpick", explaining that by the time one section is finished, another often needs to be retouched.

On April 13, 2011, nearly two decades after beginning the project, The Enigma was recognized by Guinness World Records for having the most jigsaw-puzzle pieces tattooed on the body, with 2,123 individually outlined puzzle pieces. Officials spent approximately three hours verifying the record, counting only puzzle pieces with fully visible borders; faded outlines were excluded from the official total.

Explaining the meaning behind the work, The Enigma said, "This is the backside of the puzzle. What is outside, is also inside. The art is on the inside."

== Career ==
In 1991, he got his start as a member of the Jim Rose Circus, with which he performed around the world until 1998, touring with acts such as Nine Inch Nails, Marilyn Manson, Korn, and Godsmack, and once opening for David Bowie. The Enigma then toured with Katzen, playing music and doing sideshow performances under the moniker Human Marvels. After his divorce from Katzen and the dissolution of Human Marvels, The Enigma teamed with fellow performance artist Serana Rose to form their Show Devils act. The duo toured for seven years, including performances at Universal Studios Orlando's Halloween Horror Nights event in 2007, before this act dissolved as well. For three years, The Enigma owned Tattoouija, a tattoo shop in Sidney, Nebraska, before closing the business and moving to Denver, Colorado in June 2023.

== Media appearances ==
The Enigma has appeared in a number of television programs including Penn & Teller: Bullshit! and The X-Files (Season 2 - episode 20 "Humbug"), where he played a character named "the Conundrum", loosely based upon himself. Palisade Toys later made a toy based on this character as part of their X-Files PALz action figure line. This character was also prominently featured on the X-Files pinball machine.

The Enigma appeared with Jim Rose on The Gong Show in 2008 performing their own chainsaw stunt known as the "kiss of death." He was also featured in the 2005 documentary film Freaky Circus Guy alongside sideshow performers Katzen, Danielle D'Meux, and William Darke.

In 2004, the Enigma appeared with Mike Patton, Jane Wiedlin, Karen Black, and Katzen in Steve Balderson's film Firecracker. He performed with Rose in a freak show act called Show Devils. In 2007, he appeared in Billy Talent's music video for their single "Fallen Leaves". In 2005, the Enigma toured with Pigface as a guitarist, keyboardist, and vocalist during the band's 2005 Free For All tour. A documentary DVD chronicling the tour and its creation featured the Enigma as well. He would also go on to provide vocals for one track on the band's 2009 album, 6.

In 2008, the Enigma released a DVD with Rose, directed by Robert Monson, titled Electric Acid Theatre.

Additionally, the Enigma has been featured in numerous newspapers, magazines, and books. He has twice appeared in National Geographic. In 2013, he was featured on the cover of Ripley's Believe It or Not! Special Edition.

He holds a Guinness World Record for his tattoos.
