= Tom Leppard =

British tattooed man (1935–2016)

- Born: Thomas Wooldridge; 14 October 1935; Woodbridge, UK
- Died: 12 June 2016 (aged 80); Inverness, Scotland
- Other names: Leopard Man, Leopard Man of Skye
- Occupation: Soldier
- Known for: Formerly being considered by Guinness World Records "The World's Most Tattooed Man" and "The World's Most Tattooed Male Senior"

Tom Wooldridge, better known as Tom Leppard and also as Leopard Man or the Leopard Man of Skye, (14 October 1935 – 12 June 2016) was an Englishman who was noted for previously being considered by Guinness World Records to be the world's most tattooed man and later recognized as the most tattooed senior citizen.

He is said to have spent £5,500 on his extensive body modifications, which covered his skin nearly entirely with a leopard-like colored pattern. He stated he did not feel any affiliation with leopards, and selected spots solely because they were easy for tattoo artists to do on a grand scale. Leppard was a Roman Catholic.

Leppard, a soldier, spent 28 years in the armed forces, including stints with the Royal Navy and then as a color sergeant in the Rhodesian Special Forces. He moved from London to a small derelict bothy (hut) without amenities on the Isle of Skye, Scotland, where he lived for the next 20 years as a hermit until 2008. He would travel by kayak to the mainland to buy supplies and pick up his pension and groceries once a week. He then moved to a larger house in Broadford, Skye, followed by sheltered accommodation in a retirement home on the outskirts of the city of Inverness.

== Record successors ==
Leppard was surpassed by Guinness as the Most Tattooed Man by New Zealander Lucky Diamond Rich. He had also had been given another distinction having been named the Most Tattooed Male Senior Citizen.

He died aged 80, on 12 June 2016.

After his death, his title of "The World's Most Tattooed Male Senior" was given on December 9, 2016, to American man Charles "Chuck" Helmke (died March 12, 2023), of Melbourne, Florida whose body was 97.5% covered in tattoos, Helmke also attained another Guinness World Records for the most tattooed skulls on a male. Additionally, his wife Charlotte holds the title for "Most Tattooed Female Senior"; her body is 98.75% covered in inkings. She also hold the title for most feathers tattooed on the body by a female. Between the couple, they were said to have undergone 2,000 hours being tattooed.
