= Sleeve tattoo =

Type of tattoo

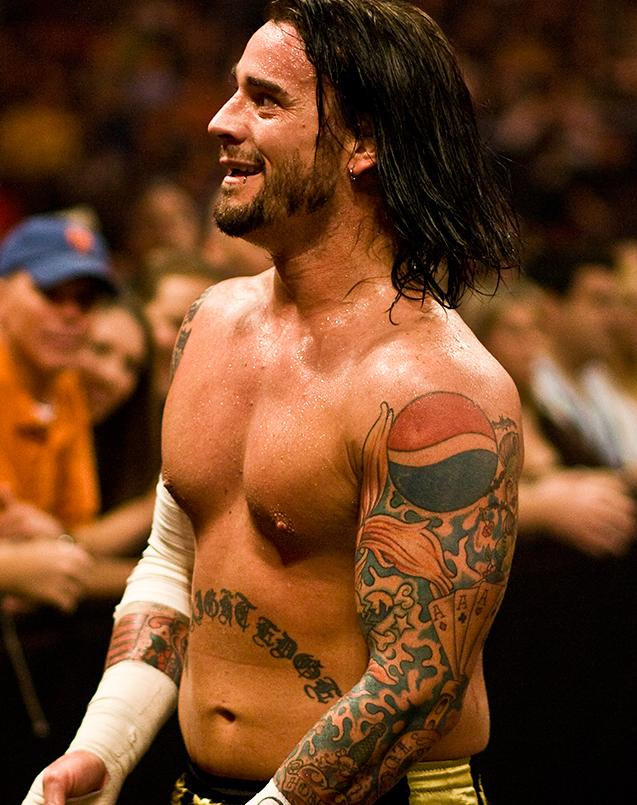
Professional wrestler CM Punk showing his sleeve tattoos, which cover his shoulder to his wrist

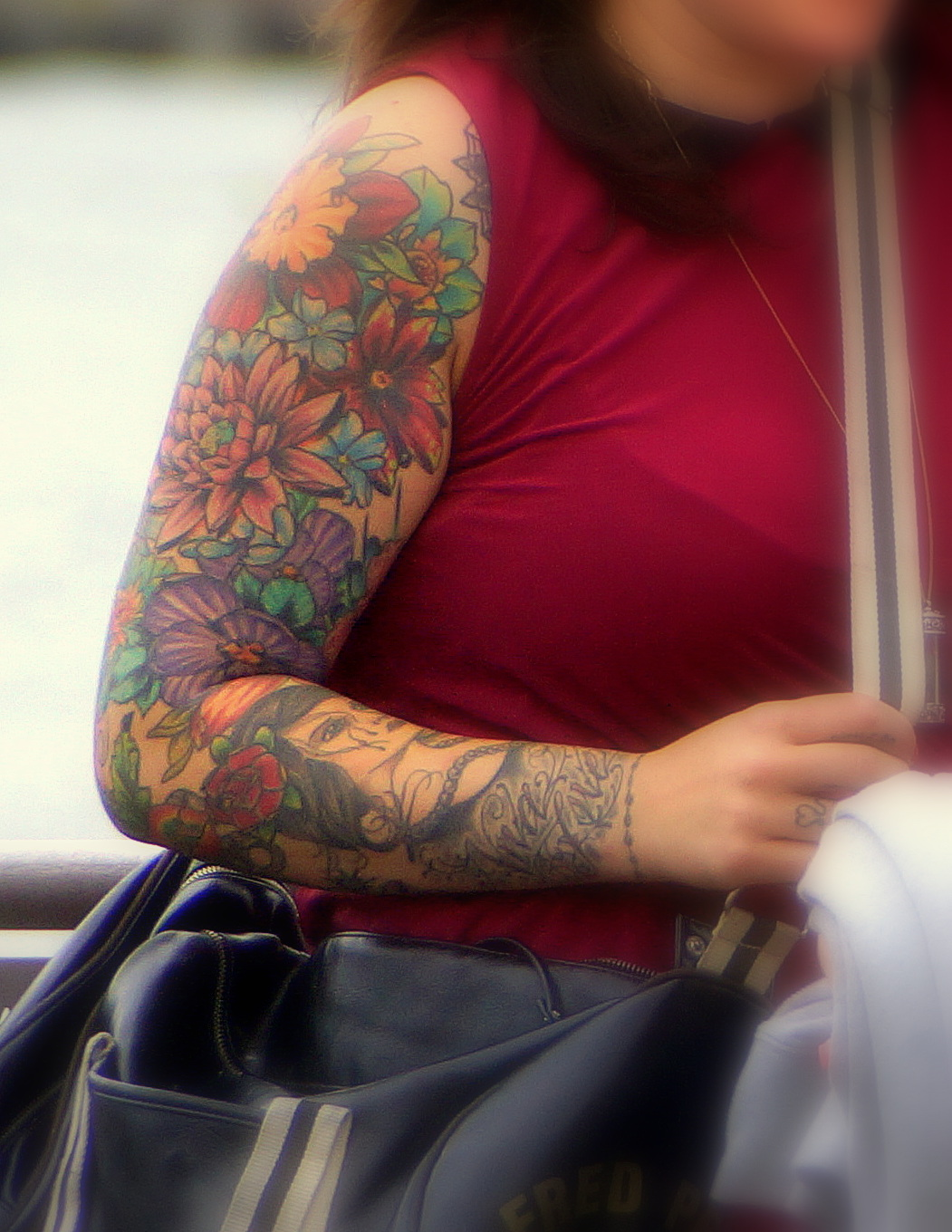
A sleeve tattoo featuring flowers

A sleeve tattoo or tattoo sleeve is a large tattoo or collection of smaller tattoos that covers most or all of a person's arm. The styles and themes of tattoo sleeves vary.

== Types ==
The term "sleeve" is a reference to the tattoo's similarity in coverage to a shirt sleeve on an article of clothing. The term is also sometimes used in reference to a large tattoo that covers a person's leg.

The most typical sleeve tattoo is a full sleeve, which covers the arm entirely in tattoos from the shoulder to the wrist. A half-sleeve covers part of the arm, usually from the shoulder to the elbow. A quarter-sleeve covers only the shoulder to midway to the elbow. The quarter-sleeve is not often seen because it is so high on the arm; for that reason, individuals may choose to get a quarter-sleeve so it can be covered with a short-sleeved shirt.

Some sleeve tattoos run beyond the length of the shoulder and onto the chest. This is a specific Japanese style sleeve called a Hikae. When both arms are completely tattooed as part of a full body tattoo, these are usually called sleeve tattoos.

== Design and application process ==
Sleeve tattoos are usually a collaboration between a tattoo artist and customer to demonstrate a personal and unified artistic theme. Other times, a sleeve is created when a person has many smaller but separate tattoos on their arm and later has them connected with a unified background design to form a sleeve. Planned sleeves generally require many long hours of tattooing and can take weeks, months, or years to complete depending on if an individual wants to take the approach of one large design or smaller ones that interconnect.

Sleeves started becoming more popular in the late 1980s during the Tattoo Renaissance, when tattoo fashions shifted from mostly badge-like images based on repetitive pre-made designs, known as flash, toward larger customized tattoos influenced by Polynesian and Japanese tattoo art.

== Restrictions ==
Some organizations have proposed rules banning sleeves among their members. The U.S. Marines prohibited recruits from getting sleeve tattoos on their arms or legs from April 1, 2007 to October 29, 2021. Those with sleeves who were already serving prior to April 2007 were protected under a grandfather clause. The U.S. Marines changed its tattoo policy on October 29, 2021, including removal of the ban on sleeve tattoos.

== Clothes ==
Several clothing companies have produced apparel that simulates the look of tattoo sleeves using transparent mesh fabric printed with tattoo designs. These sleeves can provide a temporary feeling of having a sleeve and help someone decide if it is something they want. Additionally, these companies find customers in children and teenagers who may want to mimic someone or wear the sleeves for a costume.

== See also ==
- Body suit tattoo
