= Irezumi =

Several forms of traditional Japanese tattooing

Irezumi (入れ墨, lit. 'inserting ink') (also spelled 入墨 or sometimes 刺青) is the Japanese word for tattoo, and is used in English to refer to a distinctive style of Japanese tattooing, though it is also used as a blanket term to describe a number of tattoo styles originating in Japan, including tattooing traditions from both the Ainu people and the Ryukyuan Kingdom.

All forms of irezumi are applied by hand, using wooden handles and metal needles attached via silk thread. This method also requires special ink known as Nara ink (also called zumi); tattooing practiced by both the Ainu people and the Ryukyuan people uses ink derived from the indigo plant. It is a painful and time-consuming process, practiced by a limited number of specialists known as horishi. Horishi typically have one or more apprentices working for them, whose apprenticeship can last for a long time period; historically, horishi were admired as figures of bravery and roguish sex appeal.

During the Edo period, irezumi kei ("tattoo punishment") was a criminal penalty. The location of the tattoo was determined by the crime; thieves were tattooed on the arm, murderers on the head. The shape of the tattoo was based on where the crime occurred. Tattoos came to be associated with criminals within Japanese society. Two characters in the 1972 film Hanzo the Razor, set in the Edo period, are depicted with ring tattoos on their left arms as punishment for theft and kidnapping.

At the beginning of the Meiji period, the Japanese government outlawed tattoos, which reinforced the stigma against people with tattoos and tattooing in modern-day Japan. Although tattoos are still banned in many public recreational areas today, a 2019 appeal changed the classification of tattoos as decoration instead of a medical procedure.

== Etymology ==
In Japanese, irezumi literally means 'inserting ink' and can be written in several ways, most commonly as 入れ墨. Synonyms include bunshin (文身, lit. 'patterning the body'), shisei (刺青, lit. 'piercing with blue'), and gei (黥, lit. 'tattooing'). Each of these synonyms can also be read as irezumi, a gikun reading of these kanji. Tattoos are also sometimes called horimono (彫り物, lit. 'carving') which have a slightly different significance.

== History of Japanese tattoos ==
Tattooing for spiritual and decorative purposes in Japan is thought to extend back to at least the Jōmon or Paleolithic period (approximately 10,000 BC) on the Japanese archipelago. Some scholars have suggested that the distinctive cord-marked patterns observed on the faces and bodies of figures dated to that period represent tattoos, but this claim is not unanimously accepted. There are similarities, however, between such markings and the tattoo traditions observed in other contemporaneous cultures. In the following Yayoi period (c. 300 BC–300 AD), tattoo designs were observed and remarked upon by Chinese visitors in Kyushu. Such designs were thought to have spiritual significance as well as functioning as a status symbol.

However, evidence suggesting a lack of tattooing traditions also exists; according to the early 8th-century Kojiki (古事記, "Records of Ancient Matters" or "An Account of Ancient Matters"), no such traditions of tattooing existed on the ancient Japanese mainland, with people who were tattooed regarded as outsiders. A further record in the Nihon Shoki (日本書紀, sometimes translated as The Chronicles of Japan) (the second-oldest book of classical Japanese history) chronicles that tattooing traditions were confined only to the Tsuchigumo people.

Starting in the Kofun period (300–600 AD), tattoos began to assume negative connotations. Instead of being used for ritual or status purposes, tattoo marks began to be placed on criminals as a punishment.

=== Ainu tattoos ===
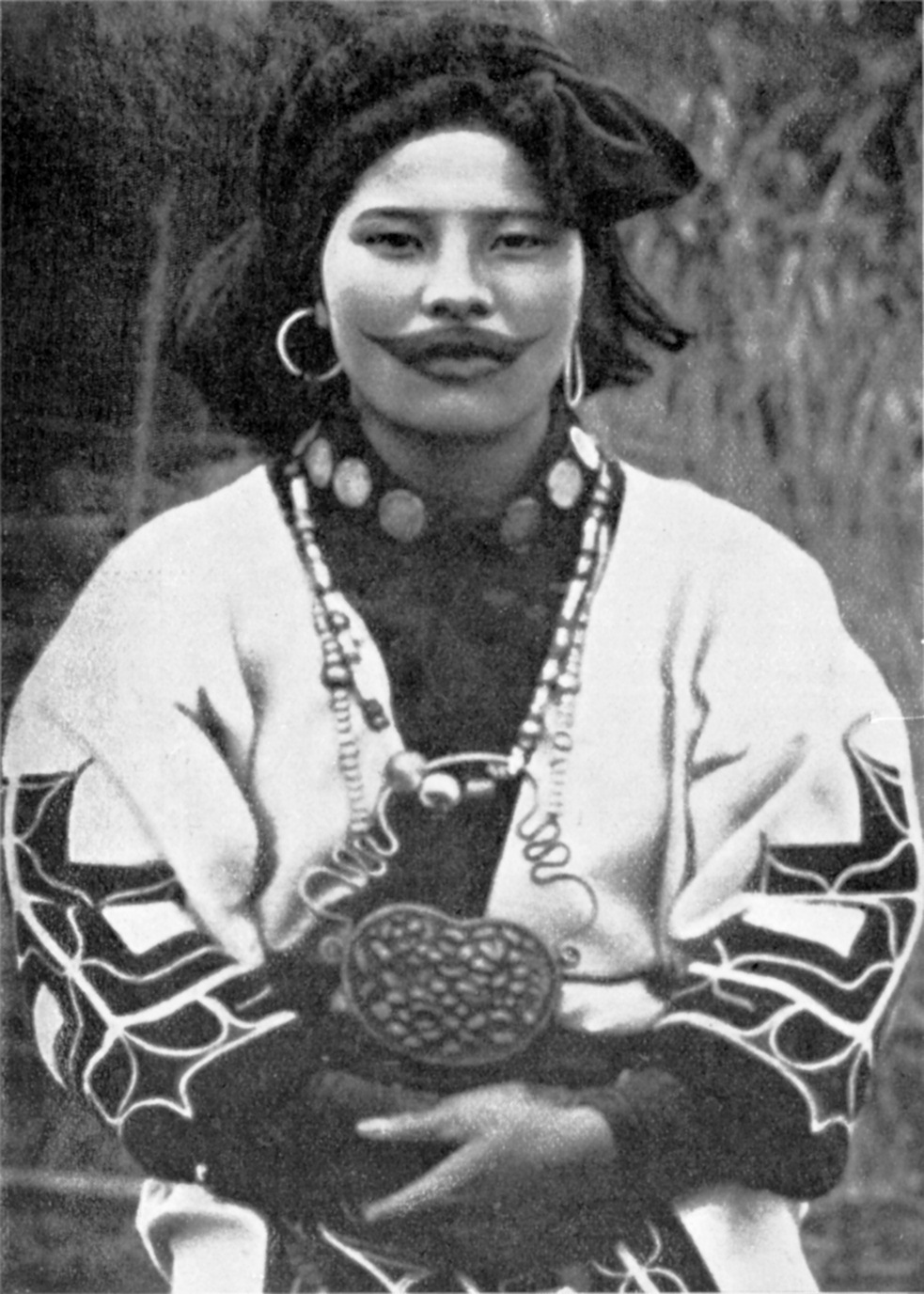
An Ainu woman with a tattoo around the mouth, 1910

The Ainu people, the indigenous people of northern Japan, are known for their traditions of tattooing, though few Ainu people and people of Ainu descent have these tattoos in the modern day. These tattoos were frequently used for decorative and social purposes, with both women and men being tattooed. Women were tattooed on the hands, forearms, and mouths in indigo to signify moving into adulthood, to protect against disease, and for aesthetic purposes.

== Japanese tattoos in the Edo period ==
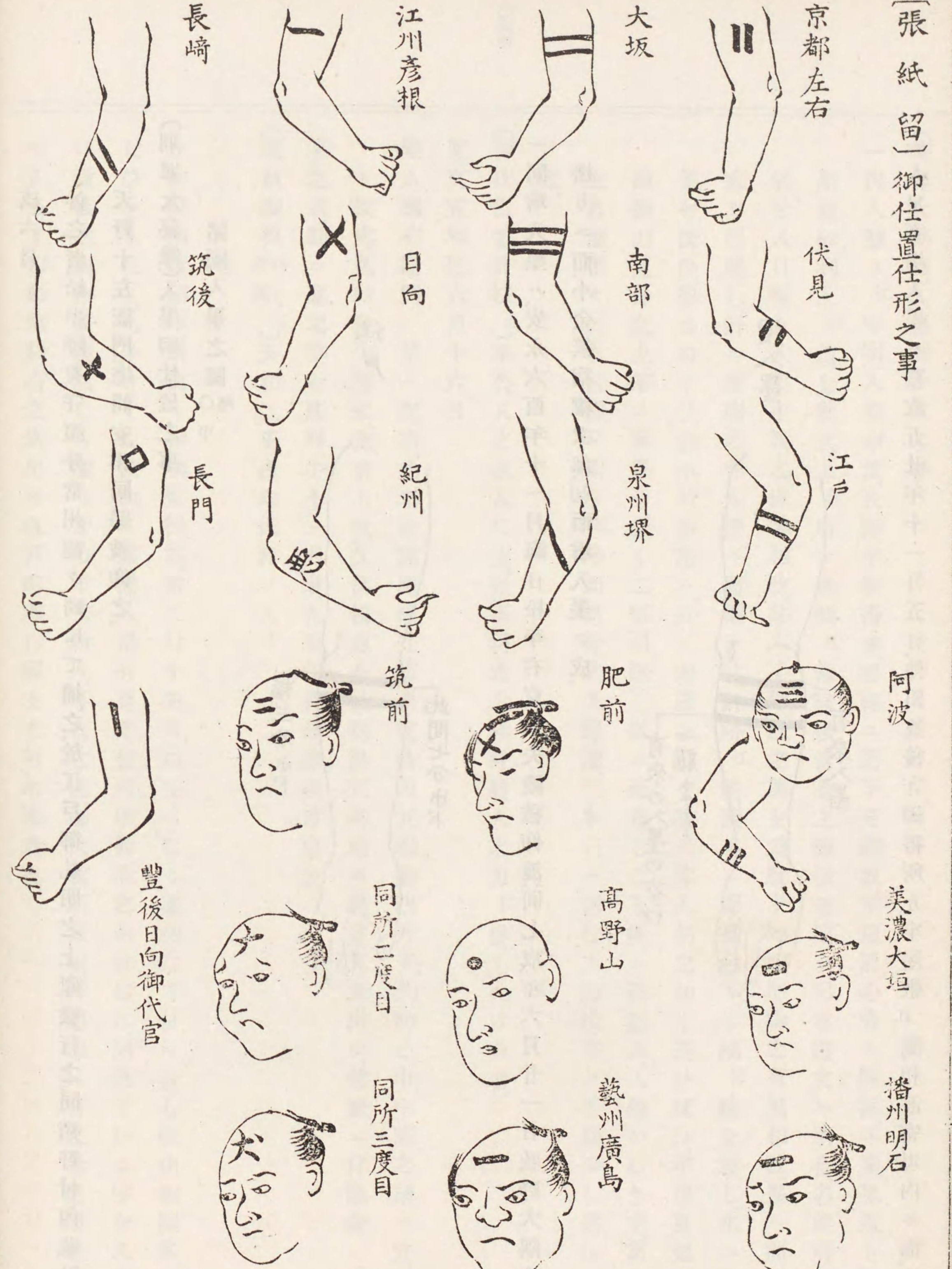
Various tattoos imposed as corporal punishment during the Edo period, from the Koji Ruien.

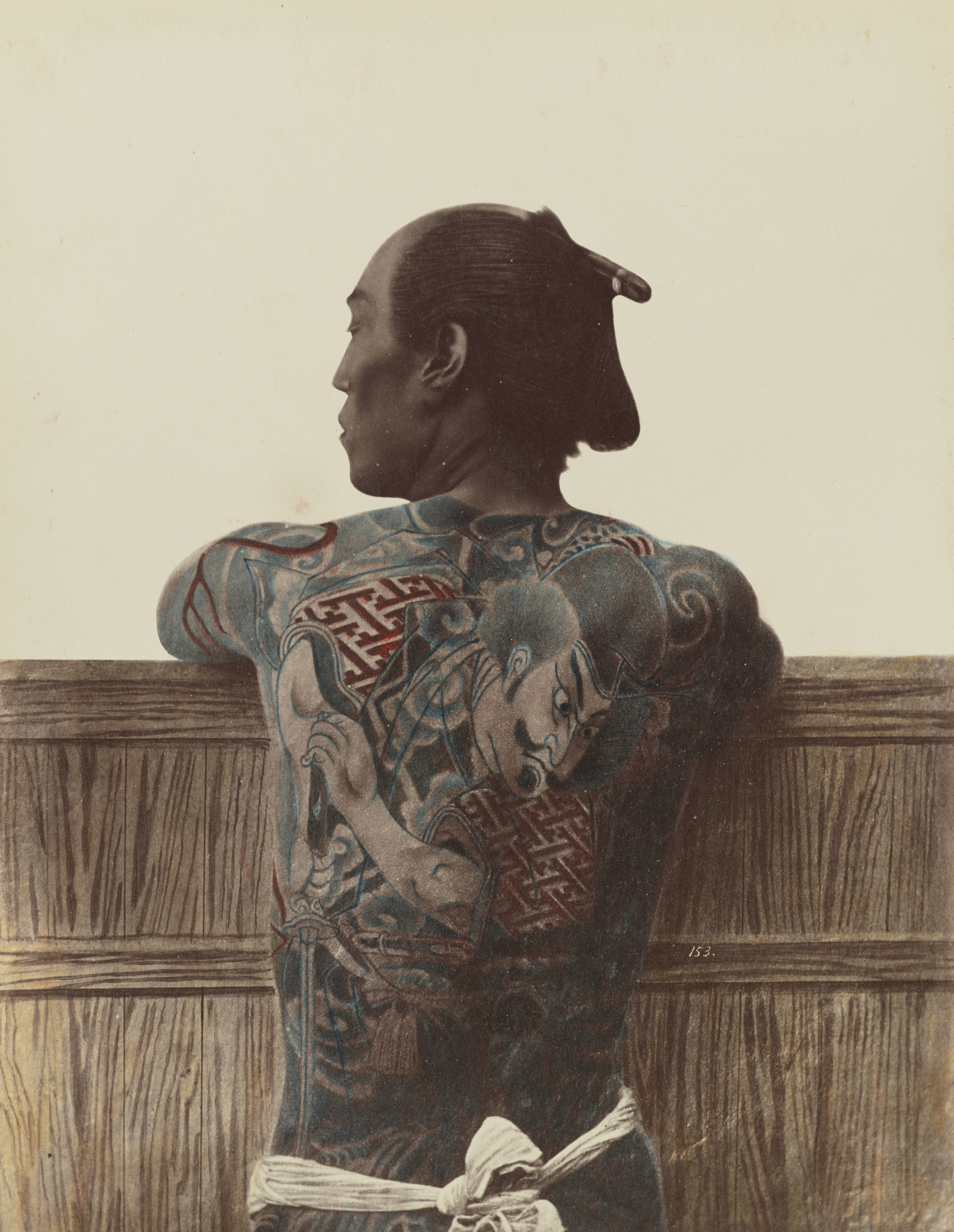
A tattooed man's back, c. 1875

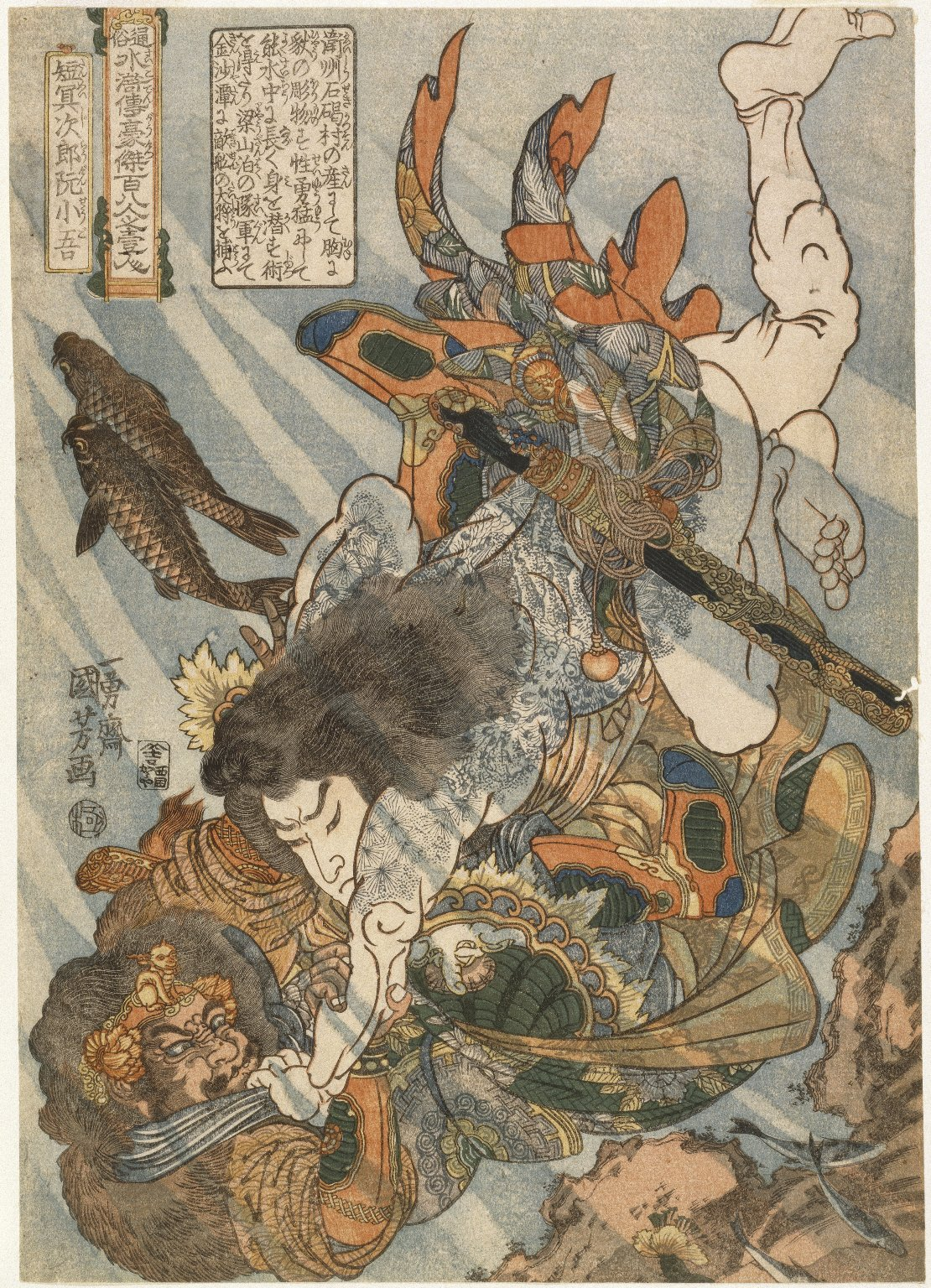
Tammeijiro Genshogo by Utagawa Kuniyoshi. Brooklyn Museum

Until the Edo period (1603–1867), the role of tattoos in Japanese society fluctuated. Tattooed marks were still used as punishment, but minor fads for decorative tattoos, some featuring designs that would be completed only when lovers' hands were joined, also came and went. It was in the Edo period however, that Japanese decorative tattooing began to develop into the advanced art form it is known as today.

The impetus for the development of irezumi as an artform was the development of the art of woodblock printing, and the release of the popular Chinese novel Suikoden in 1757 in Japan; though the novel dates back several centuries before this, 1757 marked the released of the first Japanese edition. Suikoden, a tale of rebel courage and manly bravery, was illustrated with lavish woodblock prints showing men in heroic scenes, their bodies decorated with dragons and other mythical beasts, flowers, ferocious tigers and religious images. The novel was an immediate success, creating a demand for the type of tattoos seen in the woodblock illustrations.

Woodblock artists also began to practice tattooing, using many of the same tools they used for woodblock printing. These included chisels, gouges, and, most importantly, a unique type of ink known as "Nara ink" or "Nara black", which turns blue-green under the skin.

There is some academic debate over who wore these elaborate tattoos. Some scholars say that it was the lower classes who wore—and flaunted—such tattoos. Others claim that wealthy merchants, barred by law from flaunting their wealth, wore expensive irezumi under their clothes. It is known for certain that irezumi became associated with firemen, who wore them as a form of spiritual protection.

== Tattoos in modern Japan ==
Following the opening of Japan's borders to the rest of the world at the beginning of the Meiji period, the Japanese government, conscious to protect its image and make a good first impression in the face of its new international status, outlawed tattooing, with irezumi soon taking on connotations of criminality. Nevertheless, many foreigners, fascinated with the unique skills of Japanese tattoo artists, travelled to Japan with the express intention of being tattooed there, and traditional tattooing continued underground.

Tattooing was legalized by the occupation forces in 1948, but has retained its image of criminality. For many years, traditional Japanese tattoos were associated with the yakuza, Japan's notorious mafia, and many businesses in Japan (such as public baths, fitness centers and hot springs) still ban customers with tattoos. In 2020, the Supreme Court of Japan ruled that tattoos could be performed by people other than licensed medical professionals, a requirement still present in South Korea, after the home studio of an Osaka-based tattoo artist, Taiki Masuda, was raided by the police and the artist was fined. As a result, the Japan Tattooist Organization formed and created a hygiene and safety online course for artists that provides a certificate of completion, similar to practices in other countries.

Although tattoos have gained popularity among the youth of Japan due to Western influence, tattoos continue to be stigmatised throughout most of Japan; unlike many other countries, even finding a tattoo shop in Japan can prove difficult, with tattoo shops primarily placed in areas that are very tourist- or US military-friendly. According to Kunihiro Shimada, the president of the Japan Tattoo Institute, there are an estimated 3,000 tattoo artists throughout the entirety of Japan. Around 1.4 million adults in Japan have tattoos. Attitudes around the acceptability of tattoos vary significantly by age, with 60% of Japanese people in their 20s and younger agreed that rules for tattoos should be relaxed, according to the results of a 2021 survey.

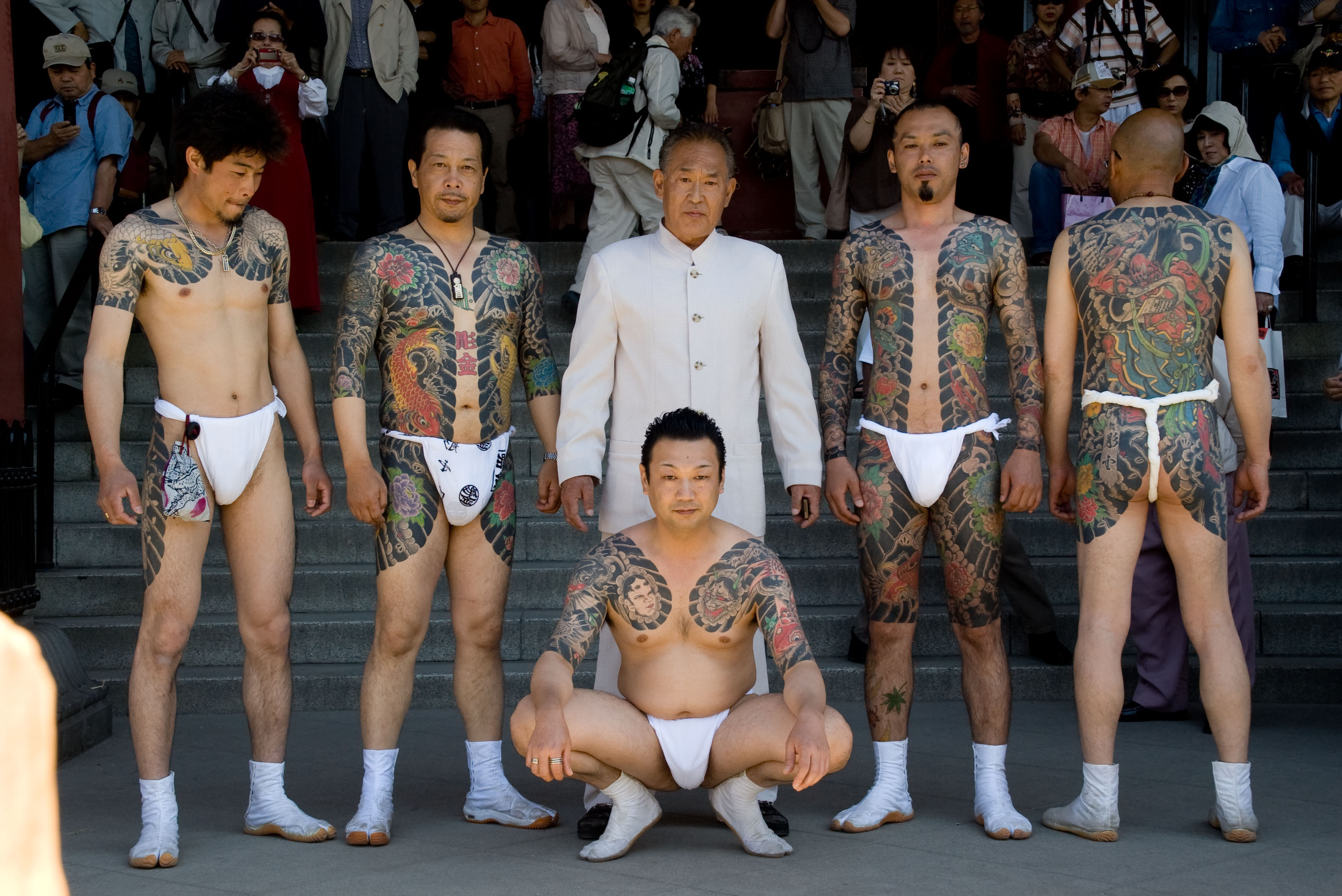
Tattooed yakuza

There are even current political repercussions for tattoos in Japan. In 2012, the then-mayor of Osaka, Tōru Hashimoto, started a campaign to rid tattoos from public sector employees, claiming that "tattoos on City workers undermined trust in the City" and threatening to fire any government employee with tattoos. That year, he authorized a survey of all public sector employees asking whether they had tattoos. Multiple city employees filed lawsuits against the City of Osaka after being reprimanded for having tattoos. This survey, along with other tattoo-related policies implemented by Hashimoto, was eventually found to have violated the city's privacy protection ordinance by the Osaka District Court. Parties and annual meetings are held by associations amongst those with tattoos.

Modern tattoos in Japan are done mostly in a similar manner to Western tattooing. Unlike traditional irezumi, where the design is mostly left up to the artist, customers bring in a design of their choice or can decide on what they would like at the shop. Many Japanese artists are well-versed in multiple styles besides traditional Japanese tattoos, giving customers the ability to select from a wide assortment of options. Modern tattoos are also done via an electric tattoo machine, in which the ink can be inserted into the machine, or the needle tip can be dipped into ink for application. Japanese artists are widely recognised for the quality of their work, despite the relative expense of irezumi tattoos, and are highly sought after.

Despite the majority of modern tattooing being done by needle and machine, irezumi is also practiced with traditional tools, though tattoo artists trained in this style can be difficult to find; unlike most Western-style tattoo artists in Japan, the majority of traditional irezumi artists are not located in the Tokyo area. Also unlike Western tattooing is the high expense of the technique, as well as the higher proportion of time required to complete one piece and the higher level of pain involved. A typical traditional body suit, covering the arms, back, thighs and chest, with a space left down the centre of the torso, can take up to five years of weekly visits to complete, and cost in excess of US$30,000. The process is also more formal than Western tattooing, with the artist having a greater level of control over the finished design.

== Process ==
=== Being tattooed ===
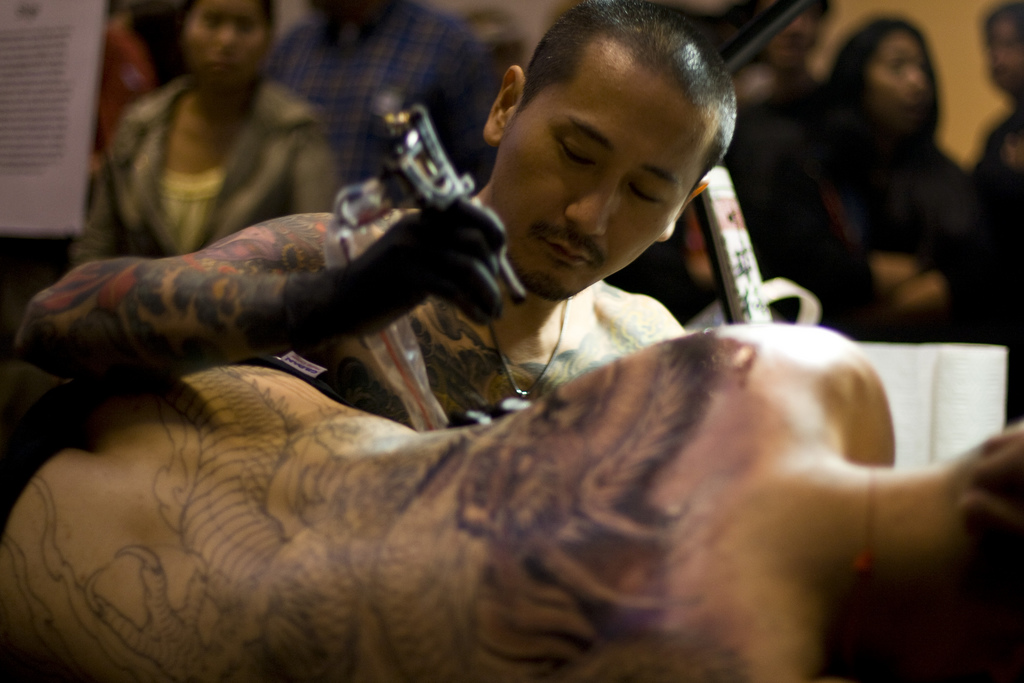
Tattoo artist working on a body suit

The process of being tattooed in the irezumi style can be difficult and time-consuming. The first step of finding a traditional tattoo artist can be a daunting task, as many tattoo artists in Japan are somewhat secretive in their work, with introductions made by word-of-mouth only, though the advent of the Internet has made finding an irezumi artists more accessible.

After an initial consultation during which the client will discuss with the tattooist the designs they are interested in, the work begins with the tattooing of the outline. This will usually be done in one sitting, often freehand (without the use of a stencil), which may require several hours to complete. When the outline is complete, the shading and colouring is done in weekly visits, or whenever the client has money to spare. When the tattoo is finished, the artist will "sign" his name in a space reserved for that purpose, most often somewhere on the back.

Wearers of traditional tattoos frequently keep their art secret, as tattoos are still seen as a sign of criminality in Japan, particularly by older people and in the work place. Many yakuza and other criminals themselves now avoid tattoos for this very reason.

=== Becoming an irezumi artist ===
The process of training to become a traditional tattoo artist is difficult and time-consuming; tattoo artists will train for many years under a master, sometimes living in the master's house, and may spend years cleaning the studio, observing and practicing in their own skin, making both the needles and other tools required, mixing inks, and painstakingly copying designs from the master's book before being allowed to tattoo clients.

Tattoo artists must master the unique styles of tattooing by hand required, and will usually be given a tattoo name by their master, most often incorporating the word hori (to engrave) and a syllable derived from the master's own name, or some other significant word. In some cases, the apprentice will take the master's name, and will become The Second or Third (and so on).

== Glossary of Japanese tattoo terms ==
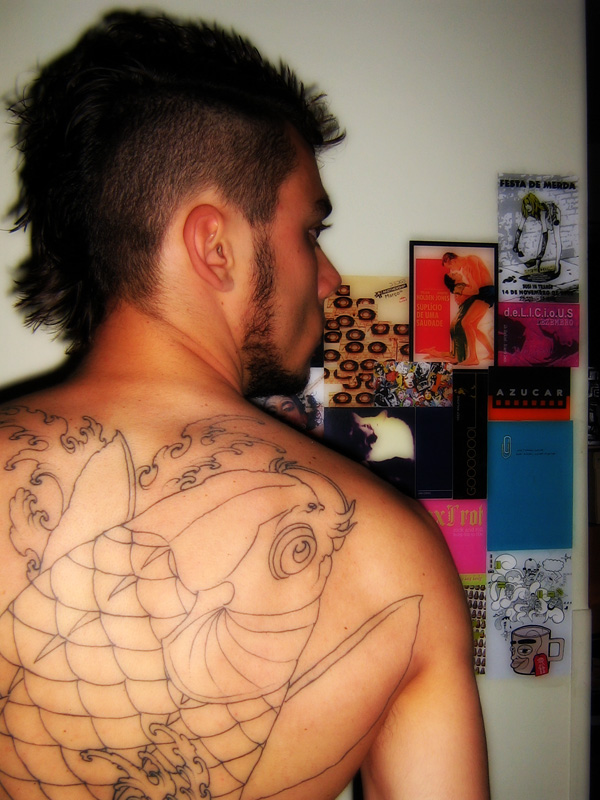
A man with a sujibori depicting a rising koi fish

Bokukei, bokkei (墨刑)
Punishment by tattooing
Donburi Sōshinbori (どんぶり 総身彫り)
A full body tattoo without the open section typically left down the centre of the chest
Gobu (五分)
A sleeve tattoo that stops above the elbow
Hanebori (羽彫り, "to carve with a feather")
A hand-tattooing technique employing a feathering motion
Hanzubon
Tattooed 'shorts'; inner thigh filled completely with tattoo work
Hikae
Chest panel tattoo, covering both pectoral muscles
Horimono (彫り物, 彫物, "carving, engraving")
Another term for traditional Japanese tattoos
Horishi (彫り師, 彫物師)
A tattoo artist
Irebokuro (入れ黒子)
From ire or ireru, meaning "to insert", and bokuro or hokuro, a beauty spot
Irezumi (入れ墨, 入墨, 刺青, 文身, 黥)
A tattoo (noun) or to tattoo someone (verb)
Kakushibori (隠し彫り, "hidden carving")
Tattooing near the armpits, the inside of the thighs and other "hidden" body areas. Also refers to the tattooing of hidden words, for example among the petals of flowers.
Katabori
An untattooed, triangle-shaped space left clear in the armpit
Kebori (毛彫り)
The tattooing of fine lines or of hair on tattooed figures
Koban gata
An untattooed, round-edged space left clear in the armpit
Munewari (胸割り)
A chest tattoo with an open space left down the middle
Munewari Sōshinbori (胸割り総身彫り)
A full body tattoo with an open space left down the middle of the chest
Nagasode (長袖)
Arm tattoo, to the wrist
Shakki
The sound of irezumi needles puncturing skin
Shichibu (七分)
A three-quarter length sleeve tattoo, to the mid forearm
Sujibori (筋彫り)
The outline of a tattoo or the process of outlining a tattoo
Sumi (墨)
The ink used to tattoo, traditionally mixed by the apprentice
Taubushi
A fully-tattooed armpit
Tebori (手彫り, "to carve by hand")
The technique of tattooing by hand
Tsuki-bori (突き彫り)
A hand-tattooing technique employing a thrusting motion
Wabori (和彫り)
A catch-all term for traditional Japanese tattooing practices
Yōbori (洋彫り)
Yō (Western) tattooing. The slang term for tattooing done with the machine.

== Common motifs ==
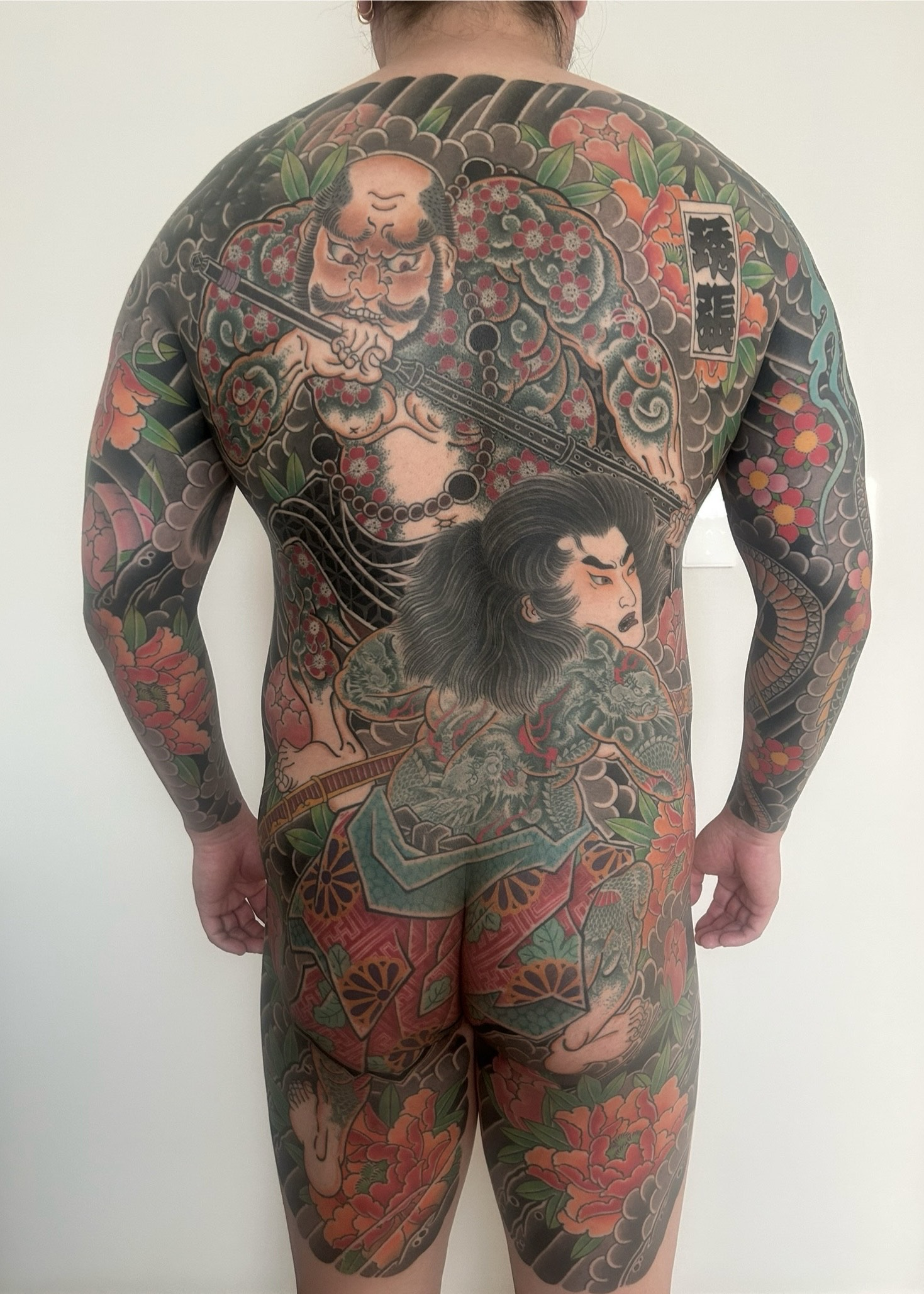
a Suikoden motif full-back Irezumi

Some common images in traditional Japanese tattoos include:

- Mythological beasts and monsters: dragons, kirin, baku, foo dogs, Hō-ō (鳳凰)
- Animals: birds, koi, tigers, snakes
- Flowers: peonies, cherry blossoms, lotuses, chrysanthemums
- Other plants: bamboo, maple leaves
- Characters from traditional folklore and literature, such as the Suikoden
- Images of the "floating world" inspired by ukiyo-e prints: geisha, samurai
- Buddhas and Buddhist deities such as Fudō Myō-ō and Kannon
- Shinto kami (deities) such as tengu
- Backgrounds: clouds, waves, wind bars
- Masks used in Noh theater (hannya)

== See also ==
- Criminal punishment in Edo-period Japan
- Criminal tattoos
- Tōyama no Kin-san
- Hajichi
- Tattooing in China
