= Horimono =

Engraving on Japanese sword blade

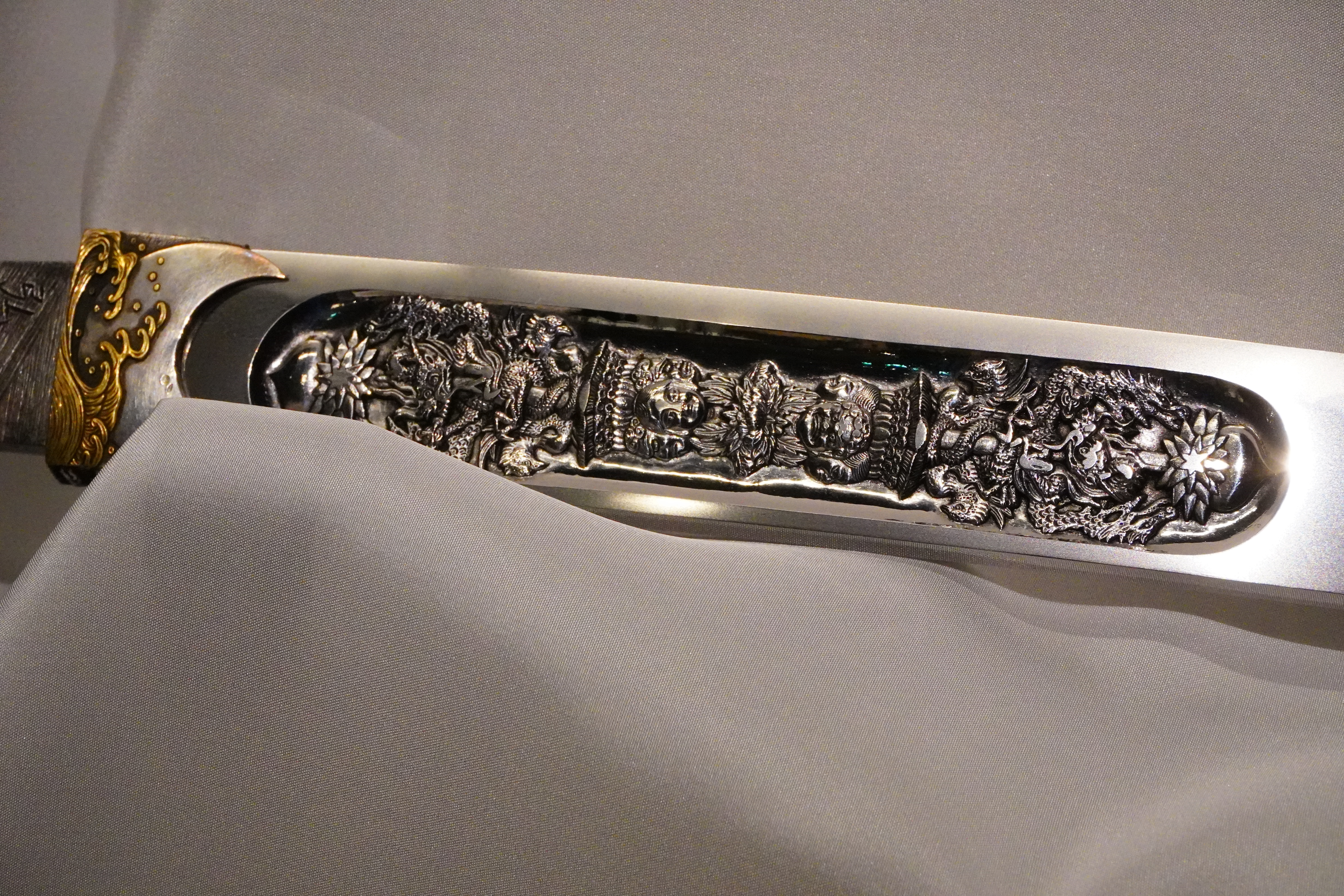
Wakizashi forged by Koyama Sōbei Munetsugu with a horimono engraved on the blade by Shōji Zenbei Nobutatsu. A vajra is engraved to pray for the protection of the offspring. Edo period

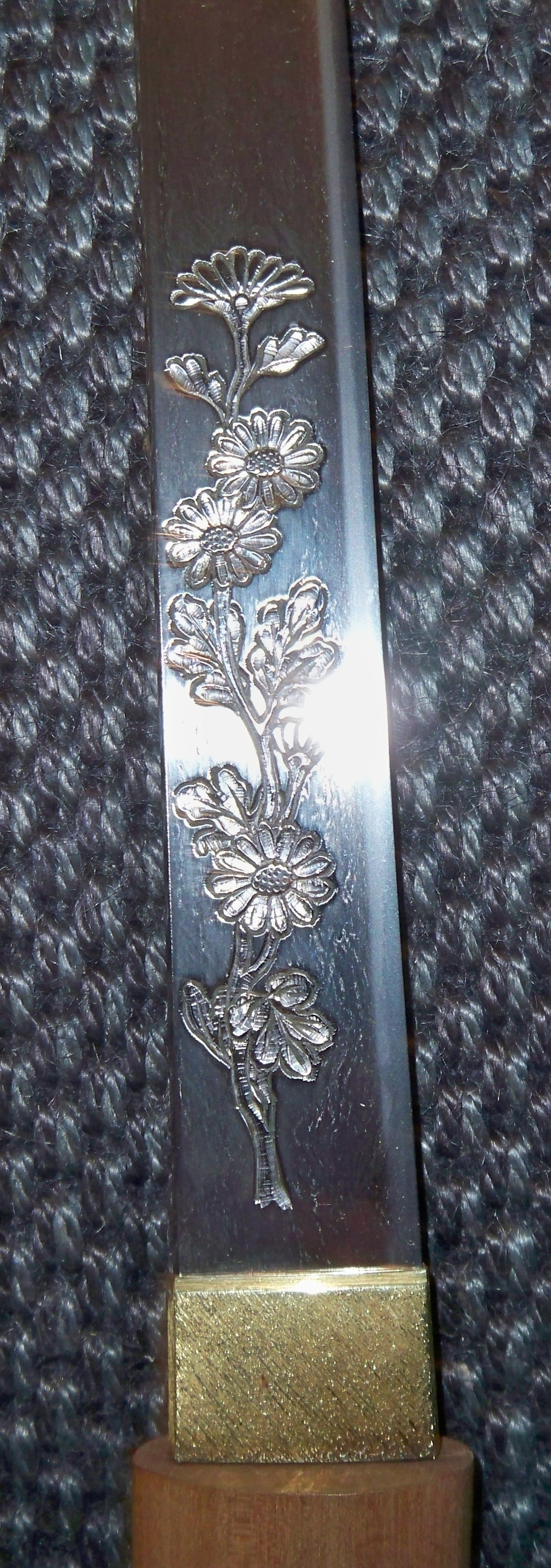
Antique Japanese wakizashi sword blade showing the horimono, of a chrysanthemum

Horimono (彫り物, 彫物, literally carving, engraving), also known as chōkoku (彫刻, "sculpture"), are the engraved images in the blade of a nihonto (日本刀) Japanese sword, which may include katana or tantō blades. The artist is called a chōkokushi (彫刻師), or a horimonoshi (彫物師, "engraver").

There are a variety of designs, which include tsume (爪) "claws", kusa kurikara (草倶利伽羅) (Arabesque style), Munenagabori (created in Munenaga), renge (蓮華) (lotus blossom) and rendai (蓮台) (lotus pedestal), fruit, dragons, and many others as auspicious motifs.

== Tattooing ==
Horimono can also refer to the practice of traditional tattooing in Japanese culture; while irezumi usually refers to any tattooing (and often has negative connotations in Japan), "horimono" is usually used to describe full-body tattoos done in the traditional style. In some cases, these tattoos can cover the whole body, including the arms and legs.

This type of tattoo is traditionally done using a tebori (手彫り) - an instrument constructed of a bundle of needles affixed to a bamboo rod. Public knowledge on this style of tattooing is limited, and one must enter an apprenticeship under a master in order to learn.

== Gallery ==
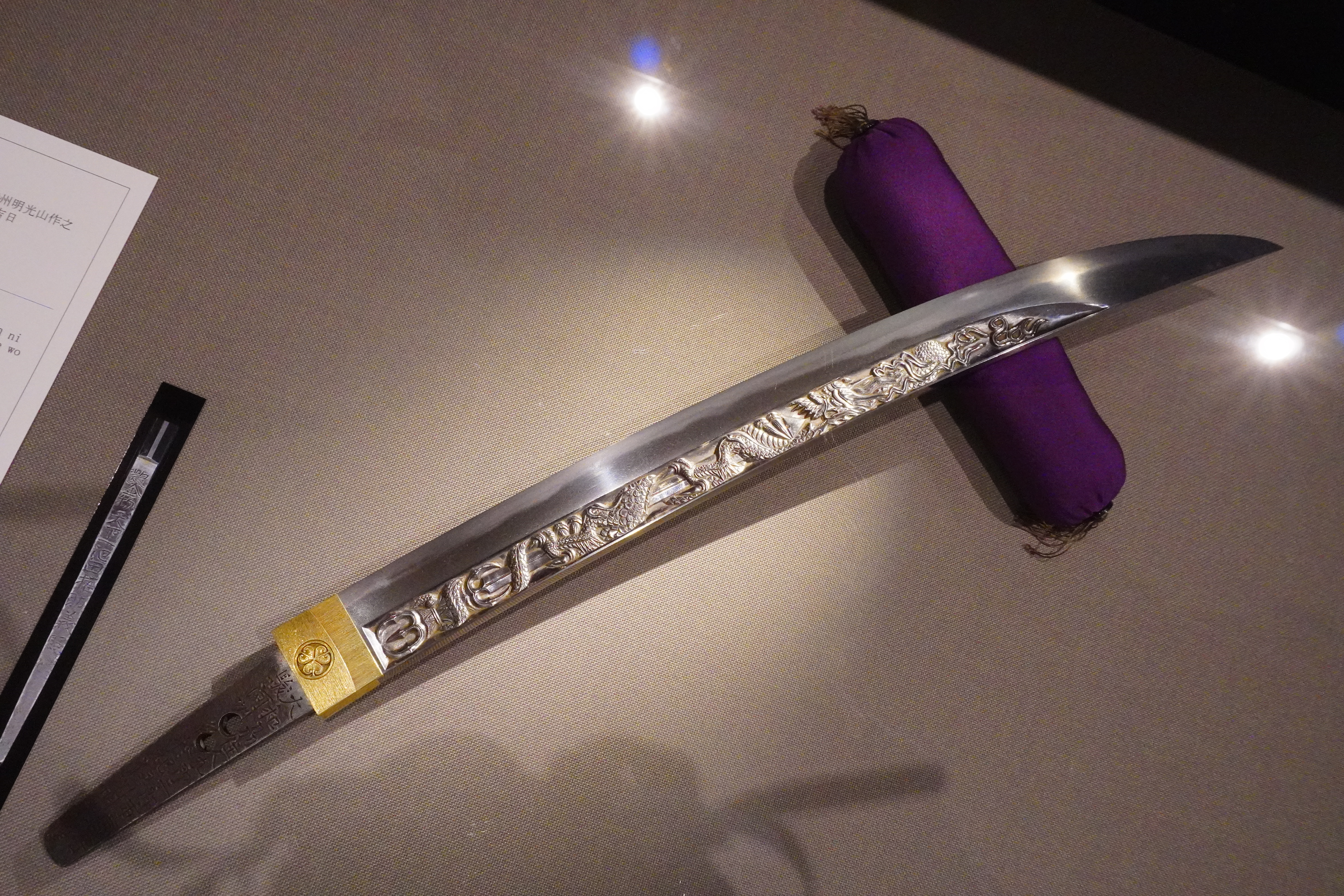
Wakizashi forged by Nanki Shigekuni (ja) with a horimono engraved on the blade by Ikeda Gonsuke Yoshiteru. Edo period, 1622, Important Sword

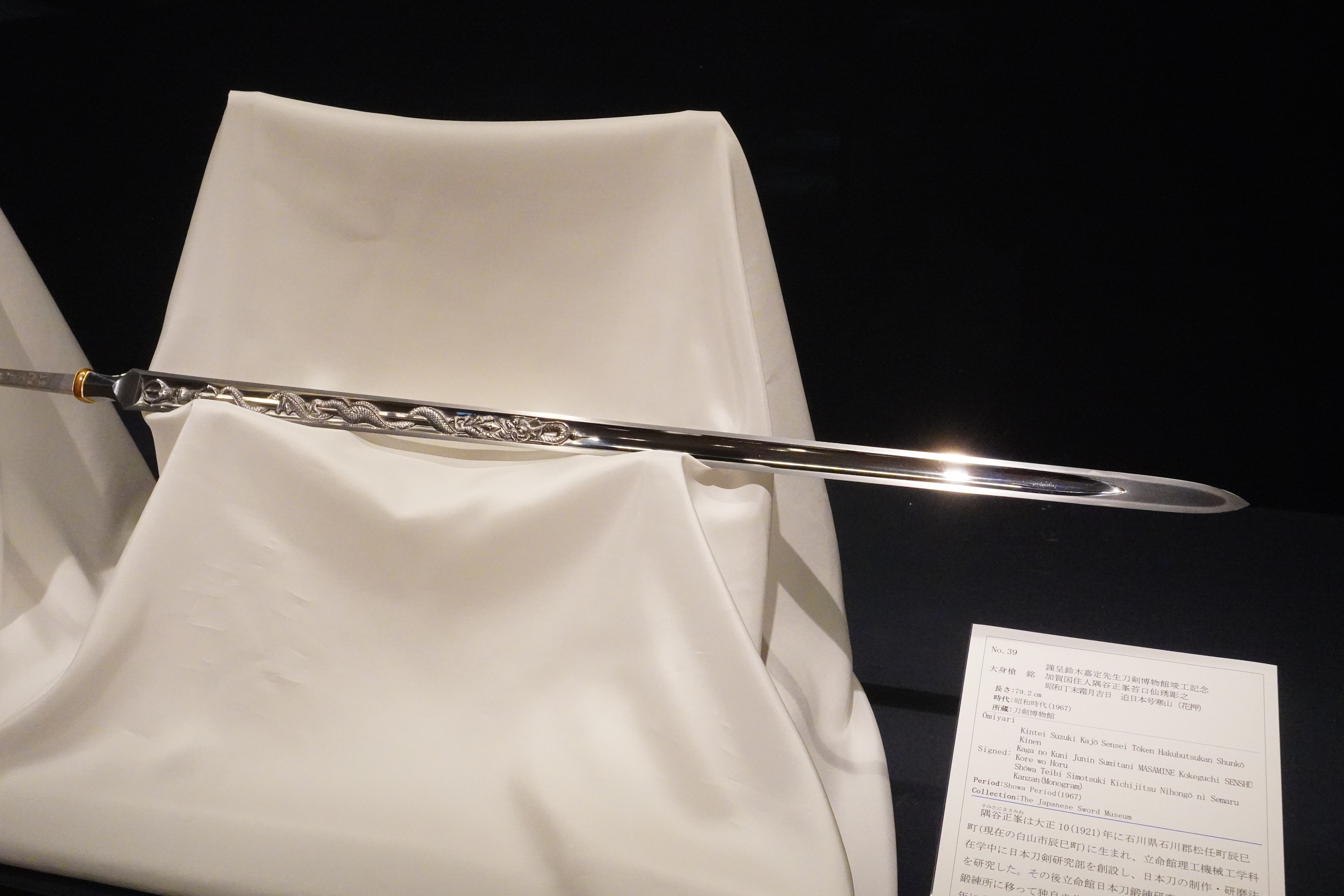
A reproduction of the Nihon-go, one of the Three Great Spears of Japan. Forged in 1967 by Living National Treasure Masamine Sumitani and engraved with a horimono by Sensyū Kokeguchi.

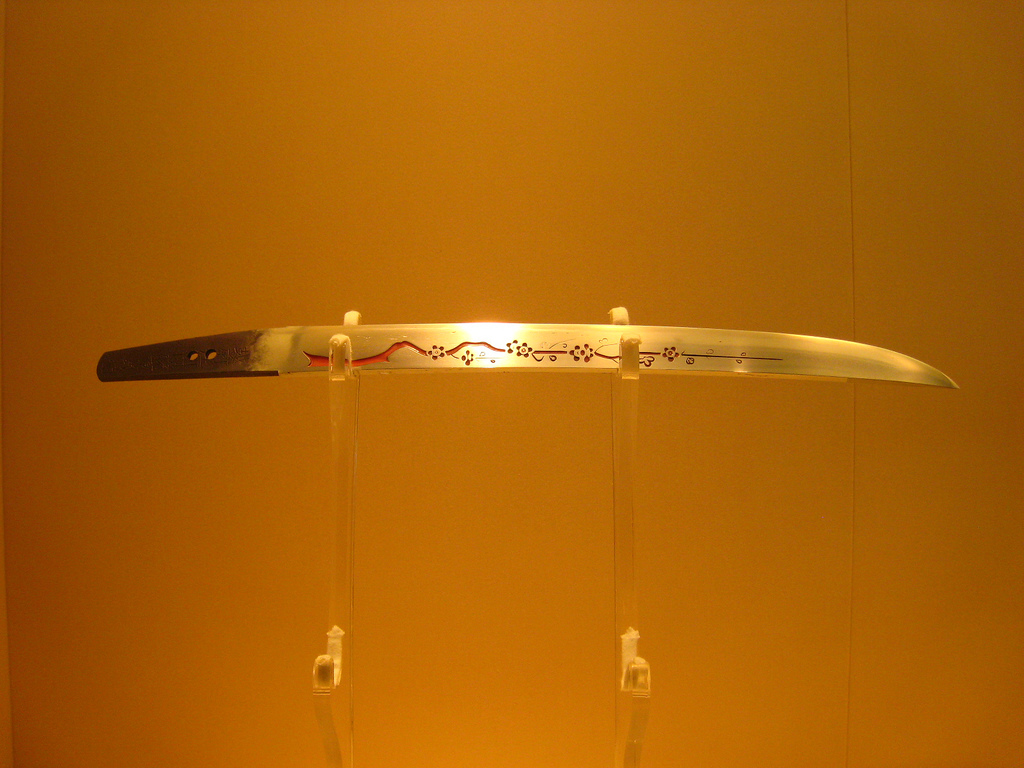

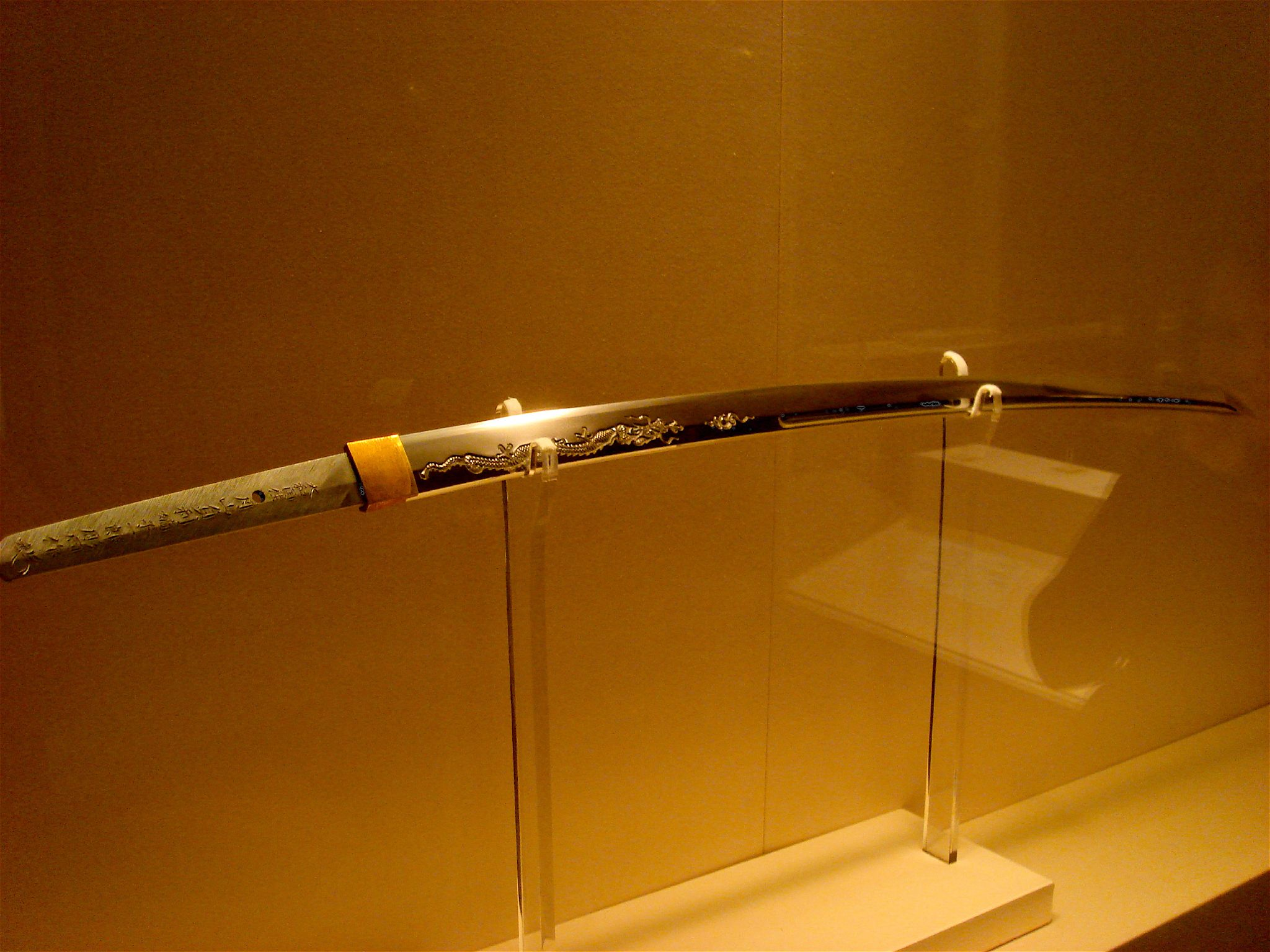

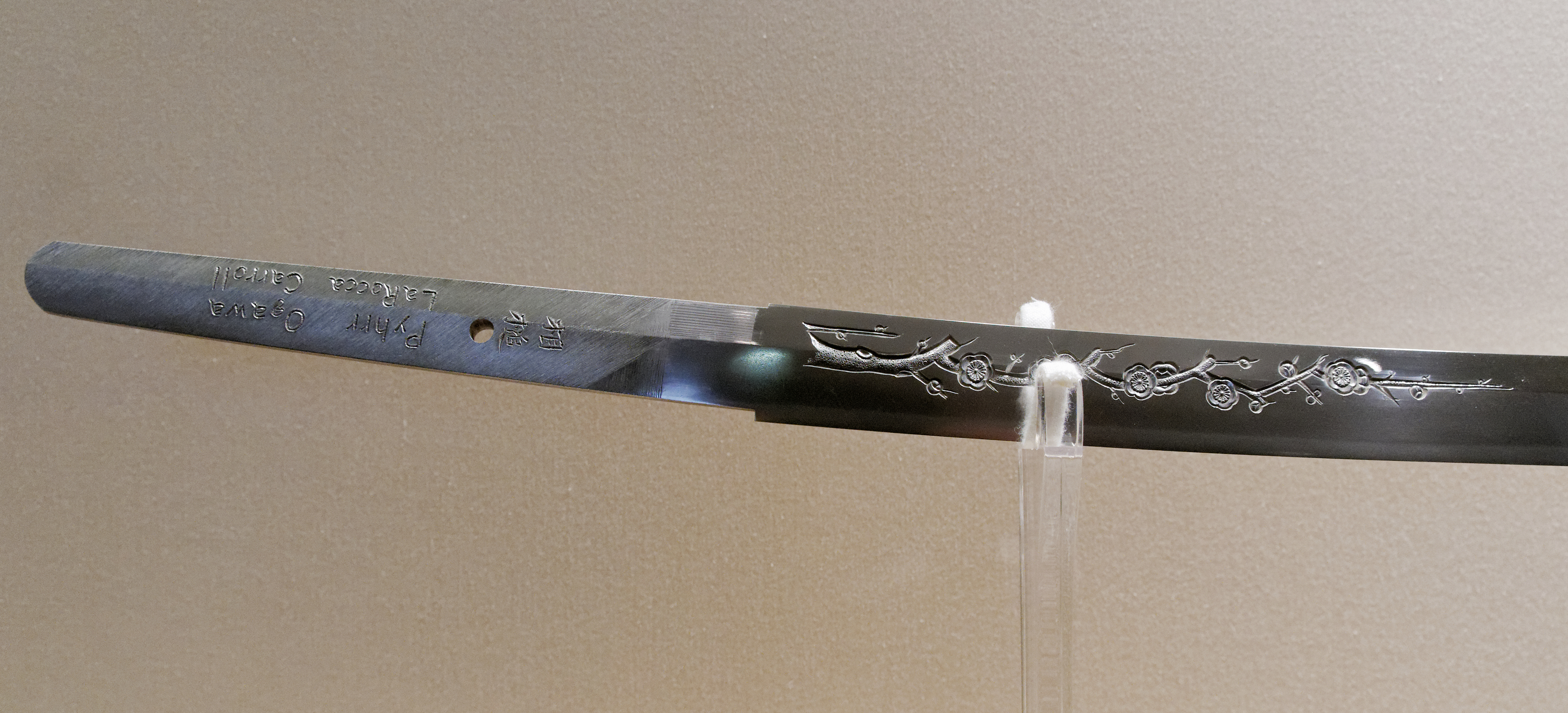

== See also ==
- Hamon (swordsmithing)
- Hajichi
