= Tattooing in China =

History, styles and regulations of tattoos in China

Tattoos (Chinese: 刺青; pinyin: cì qīng) have a long history in China. The Chinese word for tattooing (纹身) means "applying ink to the body". Tattoos are represented in early Chinese texts, including histories, dynastic penal codes, zhiguai xiaoshuo and biji works, and early prose works such as the Shangshu.

Three major categories can be used to categorize Chinese tattoo designs: the Chinese brush painting style, the Chinese realistic painting style, and the "watercolor splash ink" (水彩泼墨) style. All three categories strongly feature the Chinese national colors.

Because of Confucianism and the association with the criminal underworld, tattooing is looked down upon in China. Traditionally, tattooing was used to mark and publicly shame criminals.

== History ==
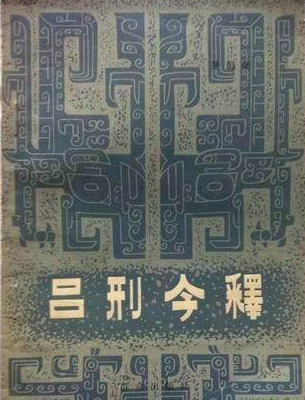
Lü Xing is an ancient Chinese book that records legal principles, judicial system, and atonement.

Tattoos have been documented since the ancient Shang dynasty, when the Zhou refugees Wu Taibo and Zhongyong were recorded cutting their hair and tattooing themselves to gain the acceptance of the Jingman people (t 荊蠻, s 荆蛮) of the Yangtze River Delta prior to the establishment of the state of Wu.

Within the context of Confucianism, the 4th or 3rd century BC Classic of Filial Piety has Confucius telling his disciple Zengzi that "Your body, including your hair and skin, has been received from your father and mother, and you should not dare to harm or destroy it. This is the beginning of filial piety." Apart from enjoining the maintenance of long hair and prohibiting suicide in most contexts, this injunction has generally been understood as prohibiting the use of tattoos as disrespectful towards one's parents and ancestors.

Han Chinese tattooing reached an apex of historical development during the Tang dynasty, but became increasingly rejected by mainstream society throughout the subsequent Song dynasty. Tattooing went underground during the Mongol Yuan dynasty and steadily decreased in popularity over the Ming and Manchu Qing eras. In China, this culture has been passed down for thousands of years, although few people are aware of it nowadays.

An early use of punitive tattooing comes from the Lü Xing (《吕刑》; 'Lü on Punishments')—a chapter of the ancient Chinese text Shangshu—which describes a penal code consisting of legal principles, the judicial system, and atonement from the Western Zhou Dynasty. King Mu of Zhou ordered his vassal Lord Lü (吕侯) to formulate the Lü Xing. It lists the "Five Punishments": the five primary penalties employed by ancient Chinese officials on criminals. The first (and least severe) of these punishments was the tattooing of the criminal's face with indelible ink. This punishment was known as mò (墨)) or qíng (黥), and later called mò xíng (墨刑) or rù mò (入墨).

Qingling, often known as "branding the face", has been used to tattoo the faces of convicts since before the Qin dynasty.

In ancient Chinese classic literature, there were different types of tattoos, including lòu shēn (镂身; 'tattoo the body'), zhā qīng (扎青), diǎn qīng (点青), and diāo qīng (雕青; 'carving'), among others. Sometimes, tattoos were a warning, such as in the story of Yue Mu Ci Zi (岳母刺字). Gradually, tattoos became a kind of personal decoration. For example, in the 16th-century novel Water Margin, one of the Four Masterworks, there are at least three important characters with tattoos: the Hua monk Lu Zhishen, the Nine stripes Long Shijin, and the prodigal son Yan Qing.

=== Linguistic origin ===
The character 文; wén is a pictogram, the oldest of the six categories of Chinese characters (六书; 六書; liùshū; 'Six Writings'). The character was first seen in oracle bone script, where it resembles a standing human figure: the top end is the head, below the head are the arms extending to the left and right, and at the bottom are the two legs. Instances of this character also contain different graphical patterns in their centers.

The Chinese bronze inscriptions of the character 文 are basically the same as those of the oracle bone script. In the small seal script, the character omits the pattern on the chest. After the change to clerical script, the character became further abstracted, and similar to its modern version.

One early meaning of the character 文; wén was "interlaced patterns" or "intertwined drawings". When used as a verb, it is interpreted as to tattoo a pattern or design on the skin, such as in (文笔匠; writing craftsman, writer) and (文身断发; 文身斷髮; tattoo breaking hair). An early source of its usage is "The System of Kings" in the Book of Rites (礼记·王制; Liji Wangzhi):

东方曰夷，被发文身，有不火食者矣。

Translation:

The people living in the East are called Yi (夷). They shave their heads and tattooed their bodies. Some of them do not cook their food.

Here, the word 文; wén means ‘tattoo’. Later generations added the radical 纟 ("silk, thread"), to help distinguish this meaning from other words it represented, resulting in the character 纹; 紋; wén; 'pattern'.

=== In Derung culture ===
The Derung people are one of the least populous ethnic minorities in China. The area in which they live, in northwest Yunnan Province, lies within the Gaoligongshan National Nature Reserve and the Three Parallel Rivers World Heritage Site. The Derung are listed as a National Intangible Cultural Heritage, and are one of the few ethnic groups that still retain traditions such as group marriage families and animism. One unique cultural practice of the Derung people is the tattooing of young women, who sometimes are referred to as the "last tattooed women" in China.

Derung girls receive facial tattoos upon reaching their jīnchāi year (金钗之年; jīnchāi zhīnián; in ancient times, when a woman was twelve years old) to symbolize reaching adulthood. The process of tattooing involves tracing unique patterns in soot with a bamboo stick around the eyebrows, nose, cheeks, and mouth, and then using a thorn or needle to prick along the patterns. With every prick, blood is wiped away and ash or grass juice is applied so it can enter the prick wound. The pinpricks are small, so it can take at least ten days to complete the tattoo. After scabbing, there will be permanent blue and purple marks on the face.

There are three potential origins for the custom of tattooing the faces of Derung women:

1. Historically, the Tibetan chieftain (西藏土司) Chawalong (察瓦龙) collected tribute from the Derung people every year. If the people could not pay, Derung women were taken from their hometowns and enslaved instead. To avoid enslavement, women resorted to self-mutilation and passive self-rescue, such as by smearing their cheeks with pot smoke or tattooing their face, to frighten their would-be captors. Over time, the custom of tattooing on the face was formed.
2. The custom may have been connected to the unique totem worship of the Derung people, which has since disappeared.
3. The custom may have originated as a symbol of beauty. There are only a few people left alive who are known as the "last tattooed women", and they have become the "wealth" of Dulongjiang that is disappearing.

The first theory is the most likely. In the past two or three hundred years, Tibetan chieftains and Lisu slave owners have continuously penetrated the Derung area and ruthlessly exploited and squeezed the Derung people.

== Significance in ancient China ==
In ancient times, tattoos were associated with a variety of customs and attributes, including beauty, tribal identity, social hierarchy, and alliances.

As early as primitive times, people would use white mud or charcoal to draw lines on their bodies and faces, as a way to beautify themselves or frighten their enemies. Clay, oil, and plant juice were also used for their perceived medicinal or physiological benefits to the body. For example, the ancient Yilou people "smeared their bodies with pork fat in winter to keep out the cold" (冬以豕膏涂身以御风寒). Gradually, this custom became associated with beauty.

The scars left by wounds in battle and hunting were considered by women to be symbolic of brave and magnificent men, which made residual body decoration popular.

In some cases, people painted totem animals on their skin. These totemic designs represented tribal ancestors or symbolic creatures, and often became closely associated with tribal identity. For example, the ancient Yue ethnic group is known for tattooing their bodies. In one tribe, a dragon pattern may have originated from a crocodile, which the people may have feared and worshipped. Another custom was the "Tattoo to avoid" (文身以避蛟龙之害; Jiao-loong), as recorded in some ancient books.

Another significance of the tattoo for prehistoric peoples was the right to have sex. Tattoos were often connected to coming-of-age customs, which signified reaching adulthood and thus the possibility of having sex. This also implies these societies upheld a sexual age limit.

== Significance in modern China ==
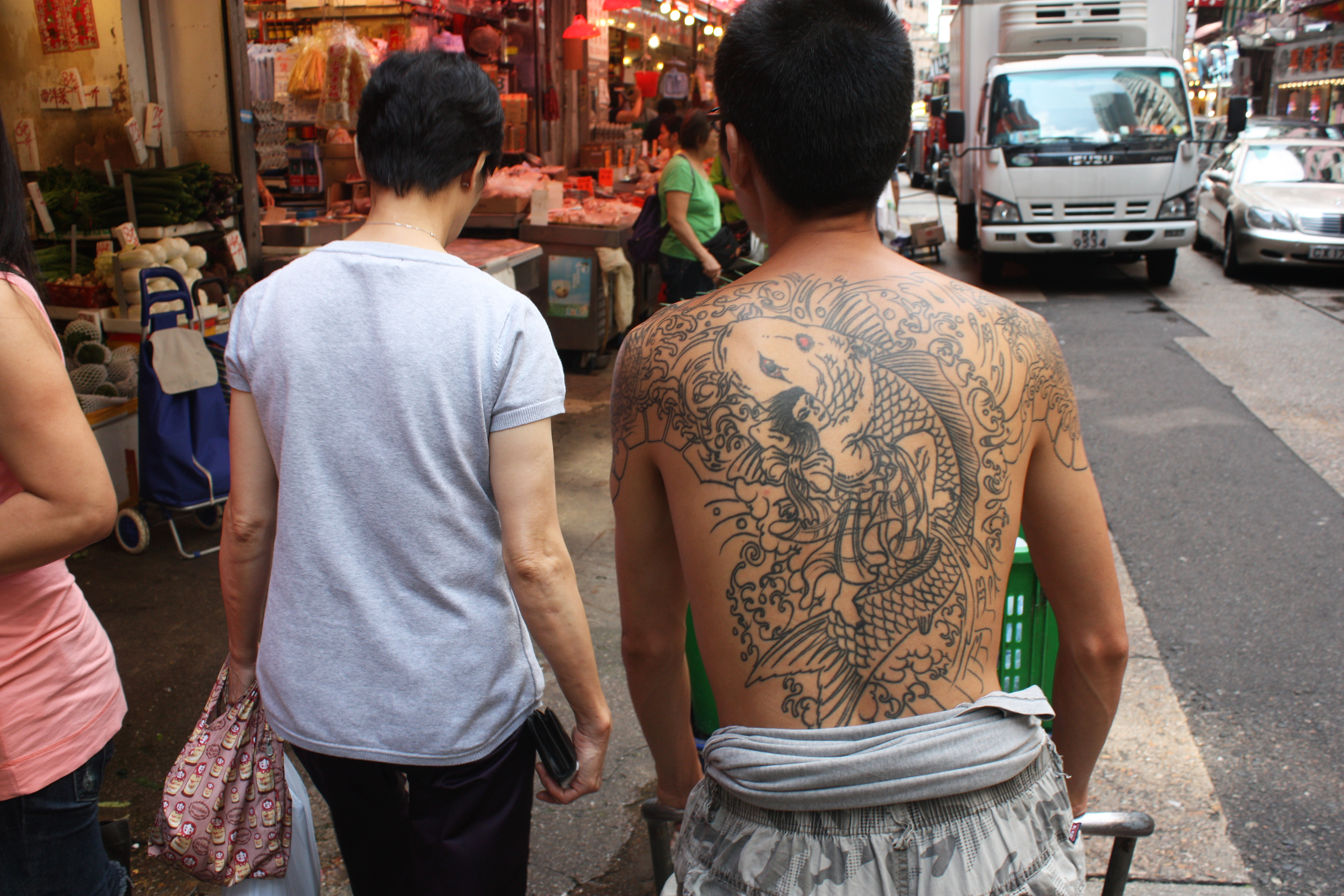
Tattooed person in Hong Kong

Although the practice of mò xíng (墨刑; "tattooing the faces of criminals") has long since disappeared, there still remains a traditional consensus in China that tattoos are a sign of bad people. Tattoos are still used by gangs and criminals, which exacerbates the stigma of tattoos.

In some groups, tattoos represent courage or social recognition. In underworld gangs, tattooing can be a test of membership. This has led to associations between tattoos and the criminal underworld. In modern Hong Kong, gang members usually have a green dragon on the left arm and a white tiger on the right arm; this has led to the phrase "left green dragon, right white tiger" (左青龙,右白虎) to represent the underworld.

In films and television during the early days of reform and opening up, characters representing the underworld, evil forces, and social evil often had tattoos on their bodies. An especially influential example was the 1996 Hong Kong movie Young and Dangerous—the rebellious characters Shanji (山鸡) and Haonan (浩南) became very prominent in popular culture, and images of them half-tattooed and holding machetes spread widely. Under the influence of film (and television propaganda), tattoos during that period were almost synonymous with the underworld, and therefore even less respectable in mainstream society.

Additionally, tattoos have a poor reputation because they run counter to standard domestic Confucian philosophy.

身体发肤，受之父母，不敢毁伤，孝之始也

Translation:

Everything on the body is given by the parents, and there must be no damage in the slightest. It means that loving the body is like loving the parents.

Even lost hair and nails should be carefully collected and preserved, not to mention skin-destroying tattoos. Even in the eyes of scholar-bureaucrats, tattoos (like haircuts) are the only things that "barbarians" are keen on. Under the influence of Confucian culture, which has always been critical of tattoos, tattoos are ‘alternative’ and ‘non-mainstream’ in the eyes of Chinese people.

In recent decades, however, acceptance of tattoos has become more common. With the improvement of the Chinese economy, the development of tattoo technology, and the penetration of foreign cultures, the attitude of Chinese domestic society towards tattoos is much more tolerant than before. Tattoo enthusiasts form associations and hold exhibitions regularly. Tattoo designs are regarded as social artworks, and famous tattoo masters are regarded as artists; there are even sociological or anthropological scholars who also study this culture from a popular perspective. Especially among the post-80s and post-90s generations, who grew up in an open environment, tattoos have taken on new meaning, and no longer have only negative associations. Tattoos now represent more than just identity distinction, and have personal meanings such as commemoration, publicity, belief, beauty, and fashion.

== Styles ==
=== Chinese brush painting style ===
Ink wash painting (水墨画; 水墨畫; shuǐmòhuà) is a form of traditional Chinese brush painting which uses only water and ink. Rich, atmospheric, and evocative images are produced by varying the focus, distribution, and concentration of the ink. "Ink is color" (墨即是色) means representing changes in color with changes in ink intensity. "Ink is divided into five colors" (墨分五色) means that different hues can be represented by layering thin washes of ink.

This style can be vividly displayed on silky skin as an ‘ink and washes’ tattoo. In this style, the intensity of a single color of ink (often black) is varied to represent changes in hue, saturation, and value. It focuses on the overall "vivid charm" (气韵生动) of the picture, and emphasizing the subjective interest of the creator, rather than realistic accuracy. It is meant to "convey the spirit with images" (以形写神) and pursue a sense of "the beauty is between the likeness and the non-likeness". The imagery is elegant and broad, including natural elements such as flowers, grass, fish, birds, and the sun, moon, and stars. Different from the exaggeration found in American tattoo styles and the visual impact of Japanese tattoo styles, Chinese brush painting tattoos apply the strength and strokes of Chinese calligraphy to create images that are soft, peaceful, and unique.

This style of tattoo is difficult to produce, and requires different technology. Because ink and wash are like a cloud of fog, without clear boundaries, tattoo artists cannot cut lines, draw outlines, and block color like other styles of tattoos. This requires the artist to deeply understand the tattoo's graphical structure and have high technical ability.

=== Chinese realistic painting style ===
The traditional style of Chinese realistic painting advocates realism, accuracy, carefulness, and neatness. It is characterized by defining forms with lines via fine brushwork which is neat, delicate, and rigorous. Usually, center pens (中锋; zhōng fēng) are used. Generally, the style is bright, calm, elegant, with unified colors, and has a strong aesthetic interest in the Chinese national colors.

In this style of tattoo, the characteristics of fine brushwork are applied to the tattoo patterns. Meticulous and delicate painting techniques are reflected in the tattoo's details. Also, an understanding of traditional painting composition and human anatomy are combined in the placement of the tattoo. This style of tattoo has certain requirements on the endurance and technical brushwork skills of the tattoo artist.

=== Watercolor splash ink style ===
The "watercolor splash ink" (水彩泼墨) style is similar to the Chinese brush painting style in artistic conception, but differs in its use of multiple colors. In this style, the usage of water to "smudge" colors and the layering of colors produces special effects, similar to a traditional watercolor painting.

== Laws and regulations ==
Chinese law has no mandatory norms for adult tattooing, as long as the individual has reached the age of 18 and has full capacity for civil conduct. The law does not place any restrictions on tattoos; it is completely determined by the individual according to circumstances and voluntary choice. However, some work units—such as conscription, government agencies, or public institutions—do not recruit people with tattoos.

According to Article 4 of Special Medical Examination Standards for Civil Servants Employment (Trial)—jointly formulated by the Ministry of Human Resources and Social Security, Ministry of Health, and National Civil Service Administration—civil servants with special requirements of physical condition are not qualified to have tattoos. (Tattoo refers to the skin tattooed with "dots, words, patterns", or despite surgical treatment, still have obvious tattoo scars.) Additionally, the Internal Affairs Regulations of the People's Police of Public Security Organs (Chapter 4, Article 37), issued by the Ministry of Public Security, mentions that "tattoos shall not be allowed" for police officers.

Citizens with tattoos are eligible for conscription only under certain circumstances. According to the Physical Examination Standards for Citizens Eligible (Chapter 1, Article 11), issued by the Ministry of National Defense, people with face or neck tattoos, with tattoos larger than 3 cm on other visible body parts (not covered by their military uniform), or with tattoos larger than 10 cm (anywhere), are not eligible.

In sports, the Administrative Measures for National Team Players of the Chinese Football Association, revised by the General Administration of Sport of China, also forbids tattoos: "Athletes of the national team and the U23 national team are forbidden to have new tattoos. [...] Tattooed athletes are not allowed to be drafted into the U20 national team and the national teams..." It also advises players with preexisting tattoos to have their tattoos removed, or, if permitted by the team, covered during training and competitions.

According to the Working Measures for the Treatment of Tattoos for Minors issued by the Office of the Leading Group for the Protection of Minors under The State Council of the Ministry of Civil Affairs: "Any enterprise, organization, or individual in China shall not provide tattoo services to minors ... coerce, lure, or instill minors to get tattoos, and shall not publish, broadcast, paste, or distribute any advertisement that contains contents that induce minors to get tattoos ... [T]he state, society, schools, and families should educate and help minors to fully understand the possible harm caused by tattoos, enhance their awareness and ability to protect themselves, and rationally refuse tattoos. The guardian of a minor shall promptly dissuade the minor from getting a tattoo."

== See also ==
- Criminal tattoo
- Irezumi
