= Hajichi =

Okinawan hand tattoo

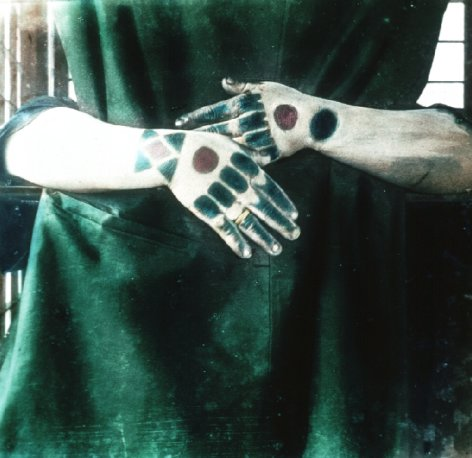
Tattoo-marks on the hands of a Ryukyuan woman

Hajichi (ハジチ, hajichi) are traditional tattoos worn on the hands of Ryukyuan (mainly Okinawan) women.

== Etymology ==
The term comes from Okinawan hajichi, literally "needle thrusting", in turn from Proto-Ryukyuan *pazuki < *pari-tuki (tone class C). Cognates in other Ryukyuan languages include Miyako (Tarama dialect) paitsïki and Yonaguni hadichi.

== History ==
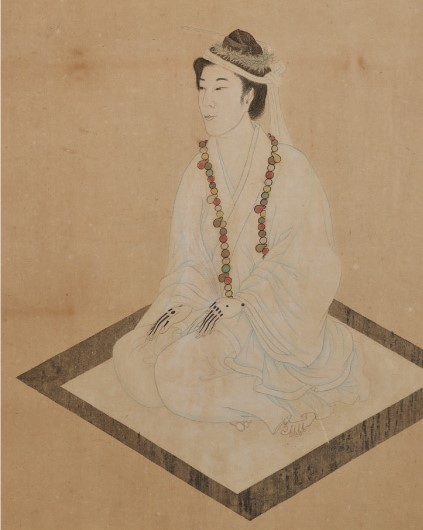
Painting of a Noro (priestess in the Ryukyuan religion), her hands decorated with tattoos, Second Sho Dynasty, circa 19th century

The custom was first recorded in the 16th century but is believed to date back much further. The tattoos could represent pride in being a woman, beauty, and protection. They were associated with rites of passage for women and could indicate marital status. The motifs and shapes varied from island to island. Among some peoples it was believed that women who lacked hajichi would risk suffering in the afterlife.

=== After annexation ===
The tattoos were banned by the Meiji government in 1899, but the practice continued for many years. The ban was mainly to crack down on indigenous Ryukyuan culture because it was deemed "primitive" by ethnic Yamato people. American servicemen during World War II were taught that one could distinguish between some Okinawan women and mainland Japanese women through hajichi. Nonetheless the practise became less and less common over time and by the 1950s most young women in Okinawa rejected getting the traditional tattoos.

By the early 21st century, tattoos were stigmatized in Japanese culture, and many Japanese associated them with the Yakuza. However, there was a movement to revive the practice as a symbol of female empowerment and of their Ryukyuan cultural heritage. Some people, concerned about the professional ramifications of permanent tattoos on their hands, turned to temporary hajichi made using fruit-based inks. However, some traditionalists object to these practices.

In 2020, an exhibition featuring pictures taken of hajichi was organized in Japan.

== Techniques ==
Traditional techniques included hand-poking the skin with bamboo needles.

== Gallery ==
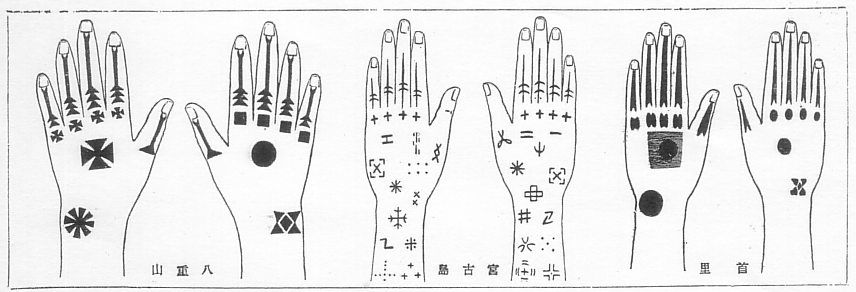
Hajichi from Okinawa

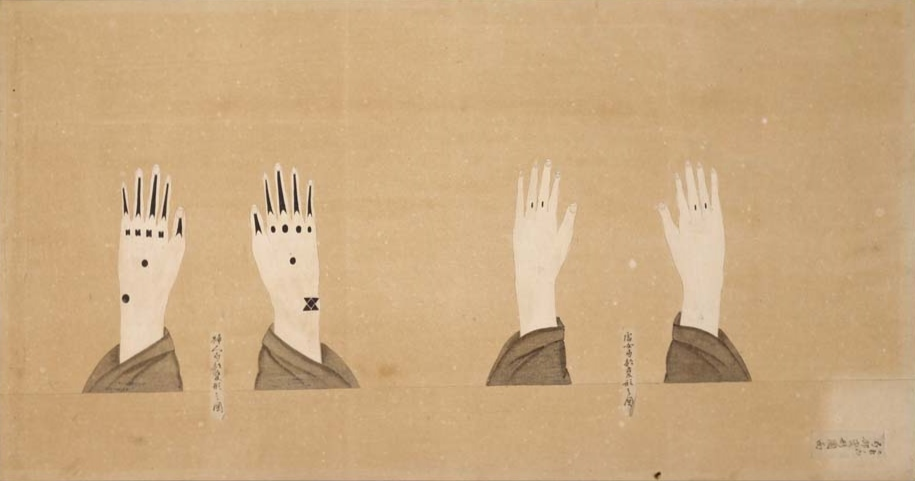
Two types of Hajichi

== See also ==
- Japanese tattoo
- Horimono
- Batok
