= Body suit (tattoo) =

Extensive body modification design

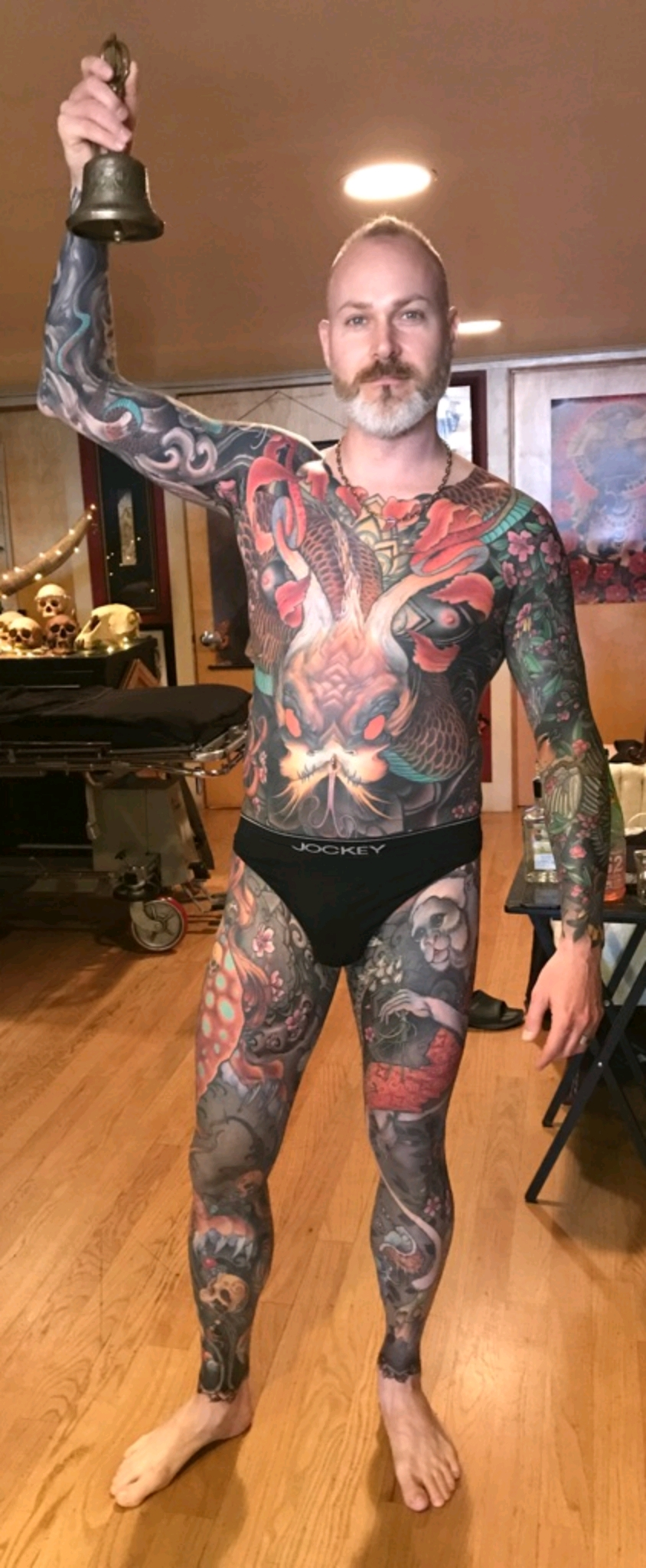
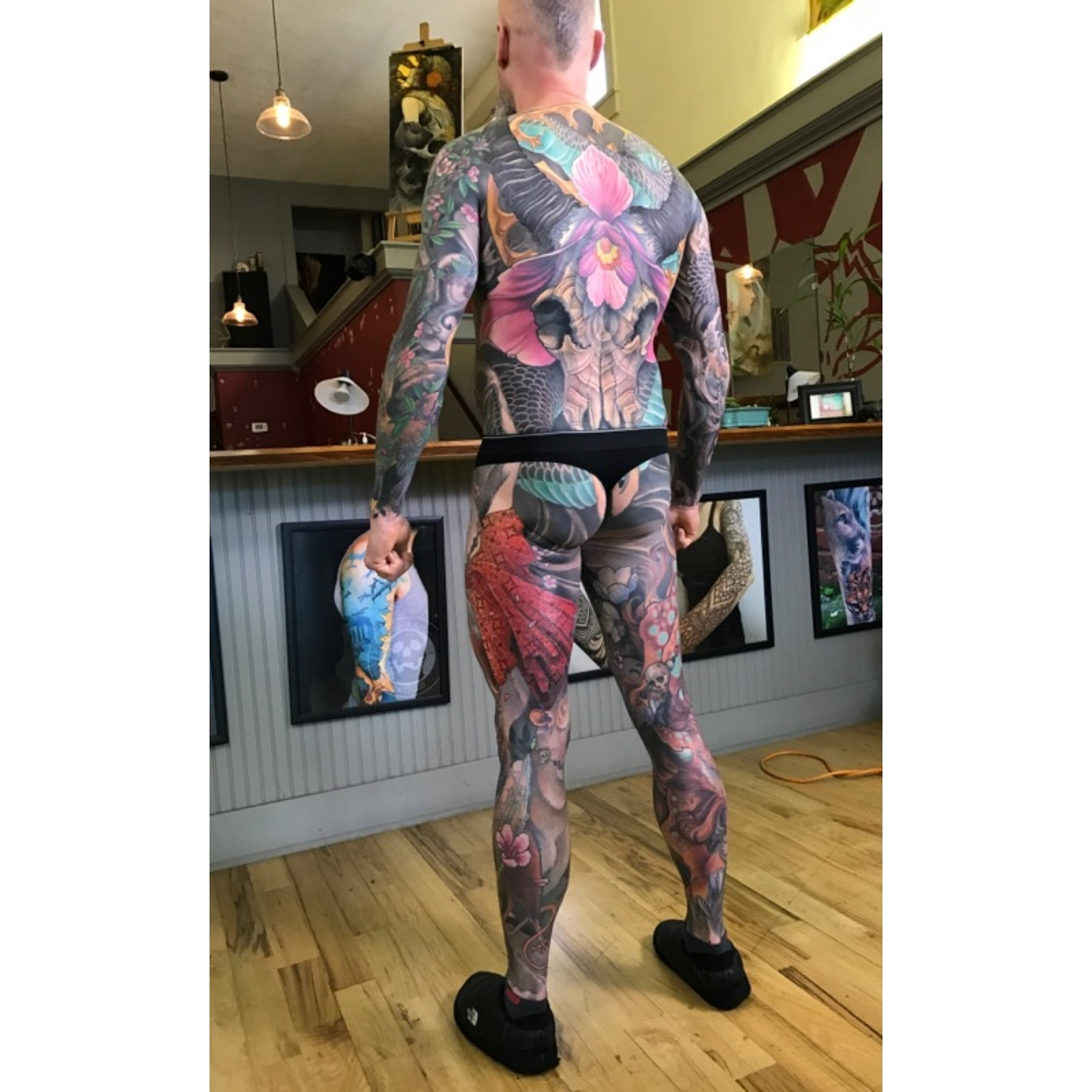
Full body suit displays a horned snake on the chest that wraps around to the back continuing onto the right arm, two birds on the left arm, a foo dog on the right leg, and a mouse and monkey on the left leg.

A body suit or full body suit is an extensive tattoo, usually of a similar pattern, style or theme that covers the entire torso or the entire body. They are associated with traditional Japanese tattooing as well as with some freak show and circus performers. Such suits are of significant cultural meaning in some traditional cultures, representing a rite of passage, marriage or a social designation.

== History ==
The body suit first came into prominence in Japanese culture in the form of irezumi, a Japanese tattooing style. In Japan during the Edo period (1603–1867 CE), tattooing gained popularity and was considered to be a form of art. However, tattooing was made illegal near the end of the Edo period, in an effort by the Japanese government to protect its image abroad. At this time, tattooing was done clandestinely, and tattoos became associated with the Japanese Yakuza organized crime syndicates, who began to incorporate the full body suit as part of their organizations' identities. Such body suits were performed using tebori, a traditional Japanese style that involves tattooing by hand, without the use of any machines. At this time, it was common for the hands, face and neck to not be tattooed, although Japanese body suits often included tattooing on genitalia.

== Origins ==
It was one of the early things developed by the Pre-Austronesians in Taiwan and coastal South China prior to at least 1500 BCE, before the Austronesian expansion into the islands of the Indo-Pacific. It was also associated with headhunting. It has also been stated that the body suit originated in Japan around 1700 CE, as a means for working middle-class people to display their wealth and status. Laws were in place that only allowed nobility to dress in fancy clothing, so some in the middle class chose tattoos as a means to adorn their bodies. Body suits are also seen in many tribes like the indigenous Tribes and Native American showing a spiritual connection and being sacred. Every tribe practices in different ways.

== Tools ==
For the most part, Austronesians used characteristic perpendicularly hafted tattooing points that were tapped on the handle with a length of wood (called the "mallet") to drive the tattooing points into the skin. The handle and mallet were made of wood while the points, either single, grouped or arranged to form a comb were made of Citrus thorns, fishbone, bone, teeth, and turtle and oyster shells.

== Full sleeve ==
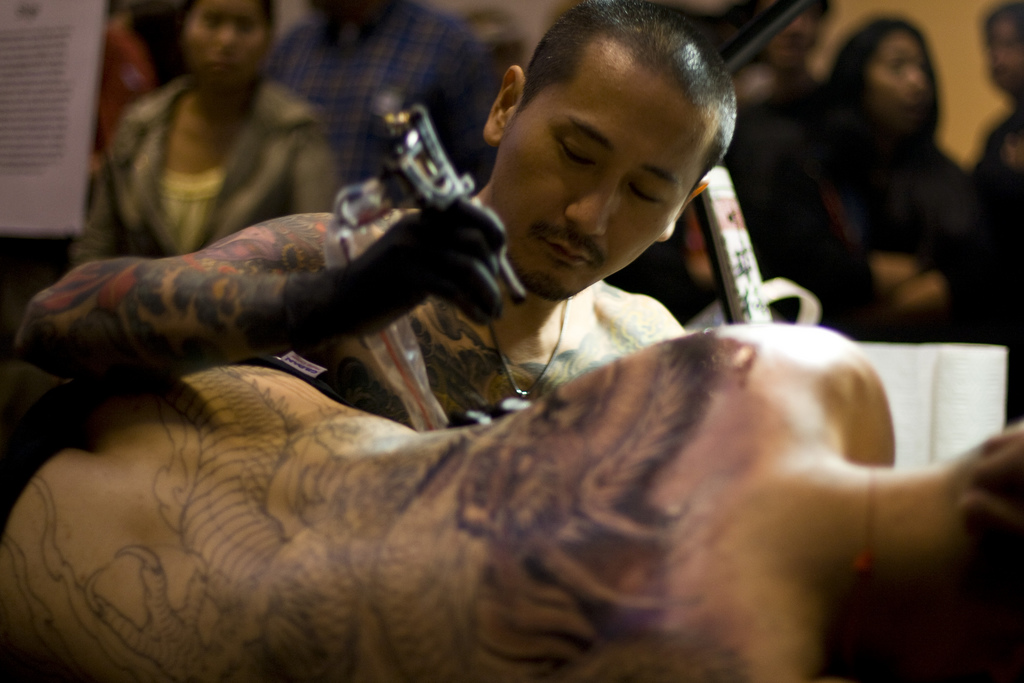
Tattoo artist working on a body suit

A full sleeve is a tattoo which completely covers an arm, from the shoulder to the wrist. A full sleeve can be part of a full body suit.

== Backpiece ==
A backpiece is a tattoo which largely or completely covers the back, and can be part of a full body suit.

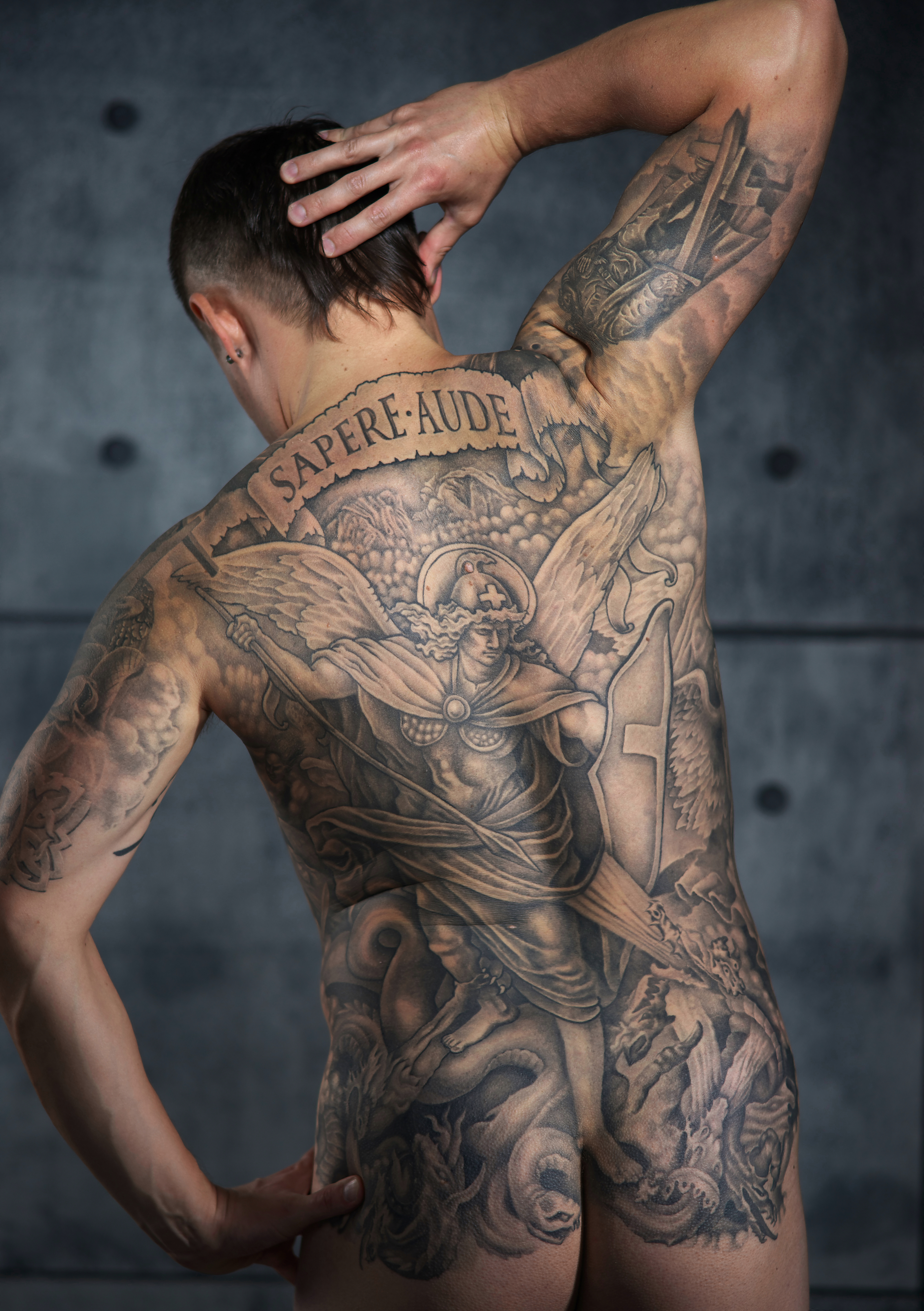

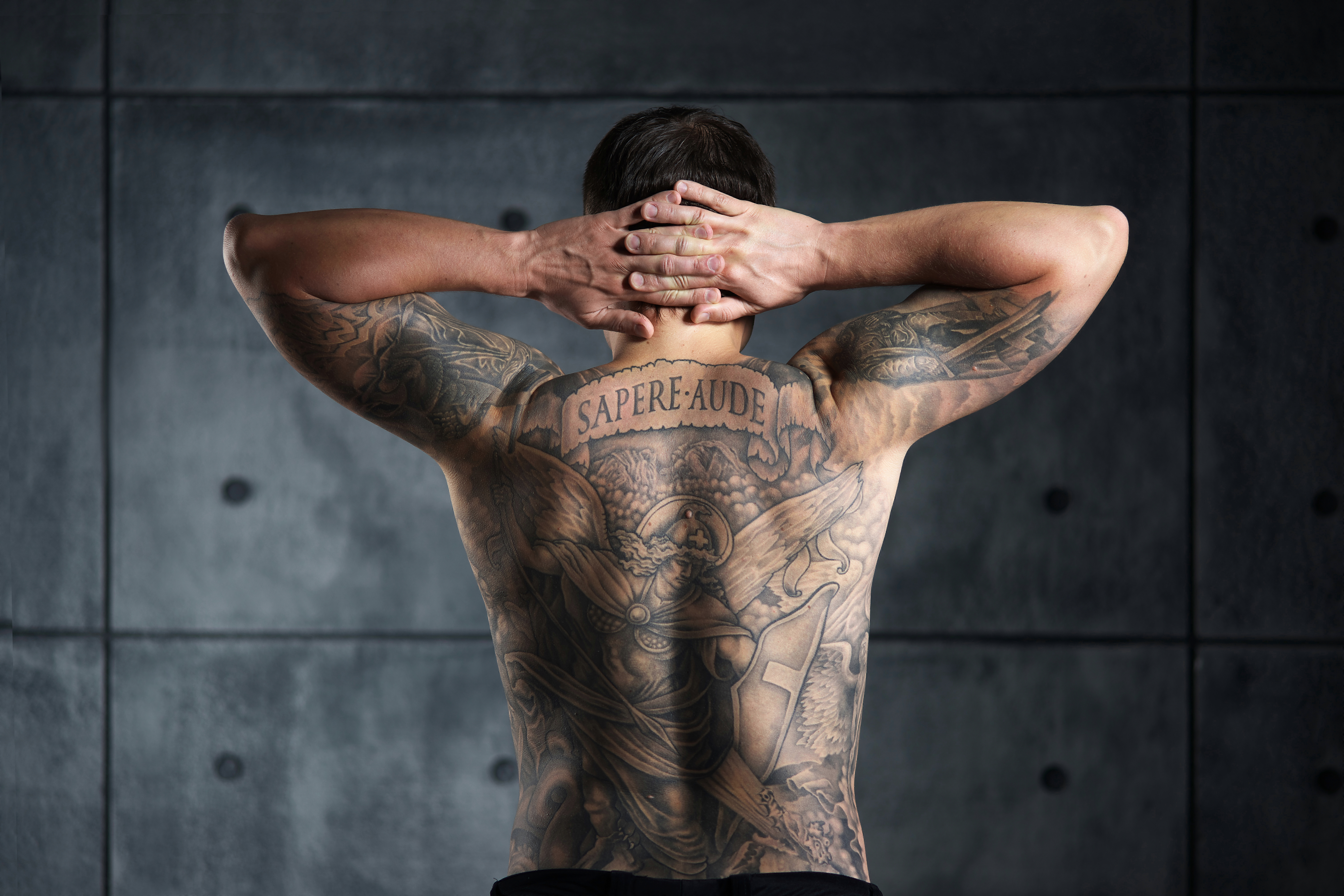

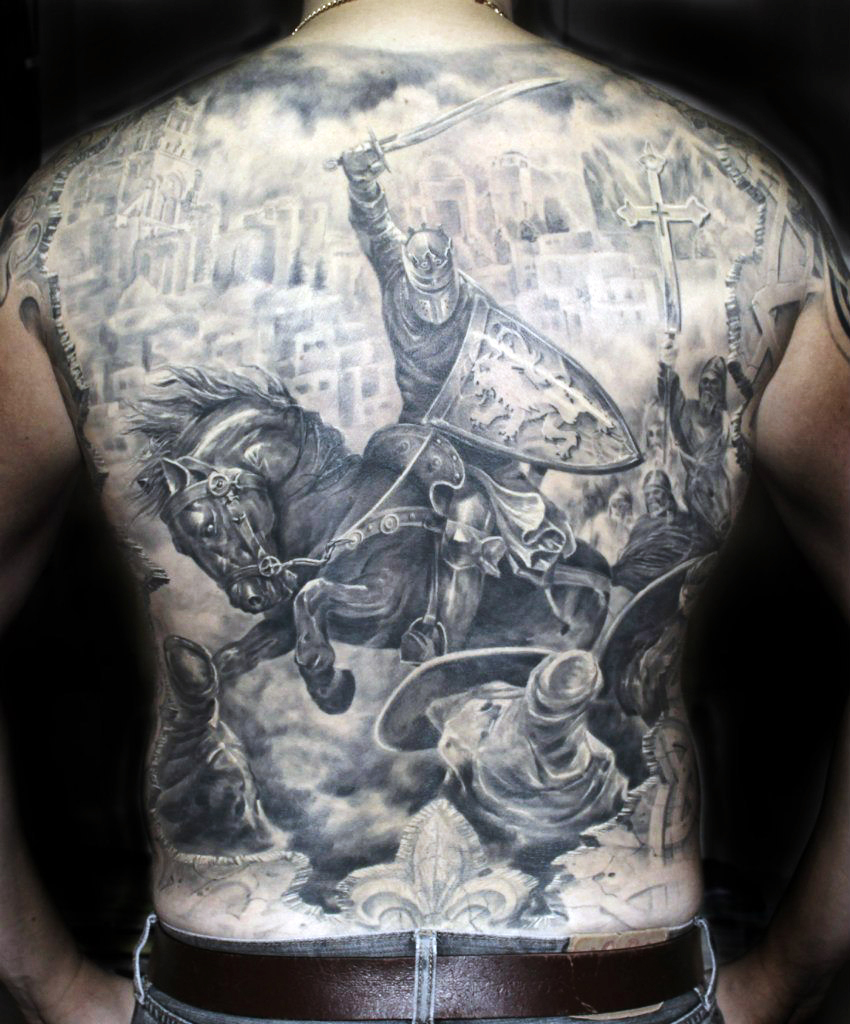

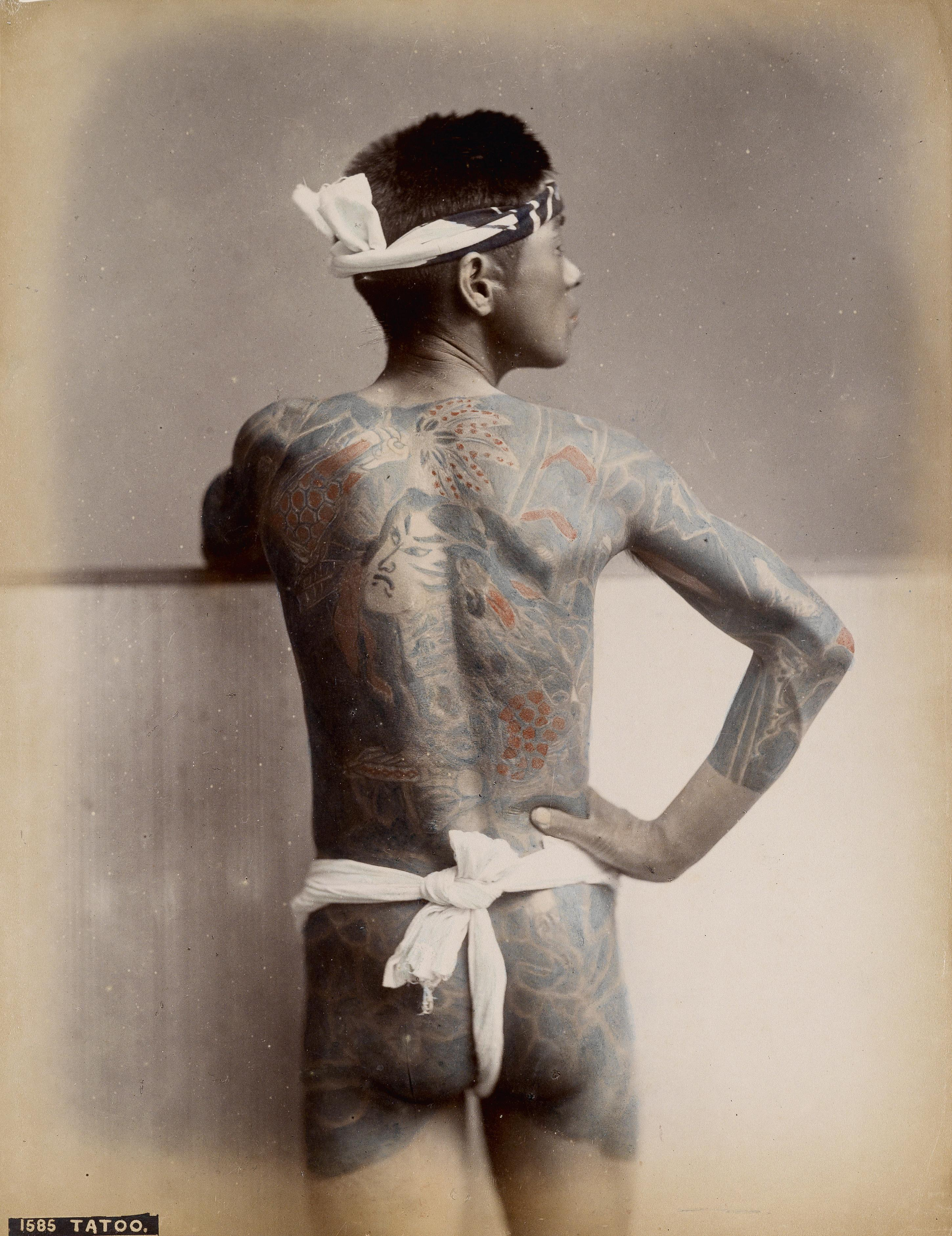
Traditional Japanese tattoo by Hori Kasiwa

== Notable wearers ==
- Travis Barker
- Djibril Cissé
- The Enigma
- Rick Genest
- Julia Gnuse
- Horiyoshi III
- Katzen
- Tom Leppard
- The Lizardman
- Lucky Diamond Rich
- Jeffree Star
- Oliver Sykes
- Isobel Varley
- Matt Heafy

== See also ==
- Body modification
- Body painting
- Lower back tattoo
- Peʻa
