= Julia Gnuse =

American woman who had 95% of her body covered in tattoos

Julia Ann Gnuse
- Born: January 18, 1955; Flint, Michigan
- Died: August 11, 2016 (aged 61)
- Known for: most tattooed woman in the world

Julia Gnuse (guh-NOO-see) (January 18, 1955 - August 11, 2016), commonly known by the nickname The Illustrated Lady or The Irvine Walker, was an American woman who had 95% of her body (including her face) covered in tattoos and held the Guinness Record for being the most tattooed woman in the world. In her mid-30s, Gnuse developed porphyria, a condition in which sunlight results in blistering of the skin. As the blisters often result in scarring, she began getting tattoos as a way to cover up the scars, which can get as deep as third degree burns. A friend of Gnuse's who was a plastic surgeon had suggested she get her skin tattooed in a pale skin tone color, similar to the color of her scars. This was attempted but did not turn out the way they had hoped.

The tattoos did not prevent the skin from blistering as they were purely aesthetic. Instead, she decided to try colorful tattoos, consisting of a variety of themes, including her favorite cartoons, her favorite actors and even a self-portrait. Gnuse appeared on the TV show Ripley's Believe it or Not!. She also had a small role in Aerosmith's music video for their song "Pink".

In her last year she started to go through laser treatment to get her facial tattoos removed.

She lived in Foothill Ranch, California, and died on August 11, 2016.

== See also ==
- Full body tattoo
- Porphyria cutanea tarda
