= Isobel Varley =

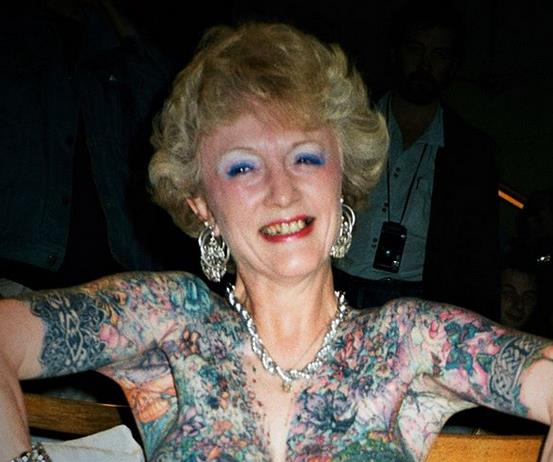
- Isobel Varley 2010, Tattoo Convention Amsterdam
- Born: Isobel Margaret Thorpe; 21 May 1937; Yorkshire, England
- Died: 11 May 2015 (aged 77); Stevenage, Hertfordshire, England
- Known for: Former World's Most Tattooed Senior Citizen (female) in Guinness World Records
- Spouse: Malcolm Varley (m. 1960–2015)
- Children: 1

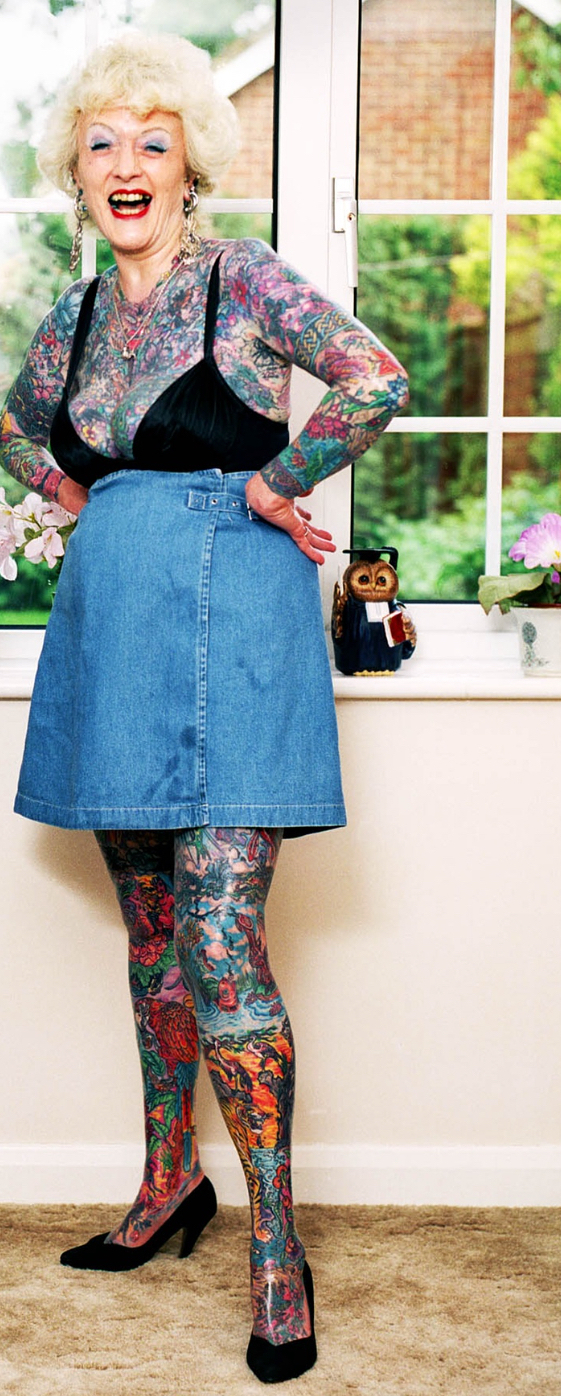
Isobel Varley: one in a series of photos of aging rebels by Muir Vidler in the Guardian, 2015

Isobel Varley (21 May 1937 – 11 May 2015) was a Guinness World Records-recognized tattooed senior, from Yorkshire, United Kingdom. She was first named "The World's Most-Tattooed Senior Woman" in 2000.

== Overview ==
Varley got her first tattoo, aged 49, at a tattoo convention at the Hammersmith Palais. According to Guinness over a ten-year period, Varley had over 200 designs inked, covering roughly 93% of her body in tattoos. She reported that "the only areas not completely tattooed is my face, the soles of my feet my ears and some area on my hands." Varley has also estimated to have spent over 500 hours decorating her body.

== Death ==
Varley died 11 May 2015 at Lister Hospital, Stevenage, United Kingdom after an ongoing battle with Alzheimer's disease.
