= Cleavage (breasts) =

Separation between human breasts

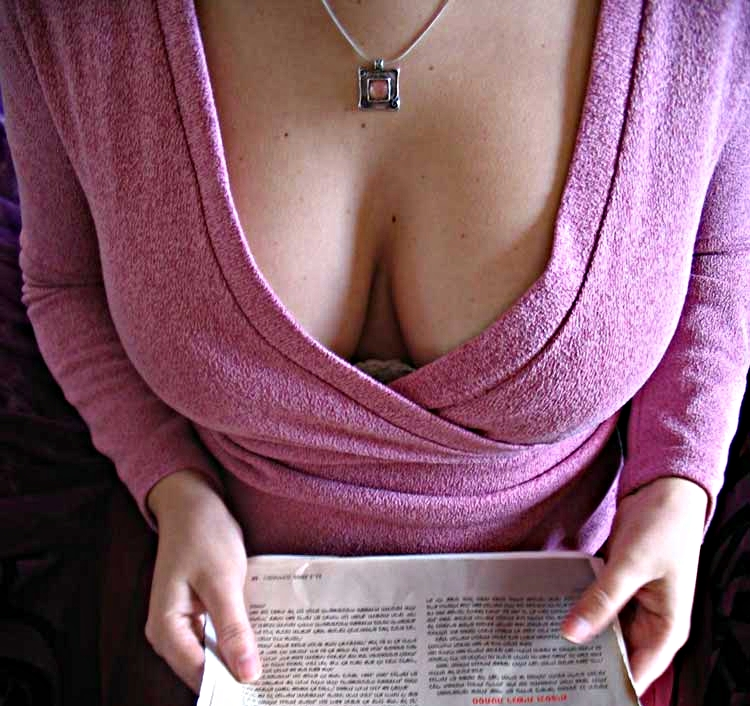
Décolletage exposing a woman's cleavage

Cleavage, formally the intermammary cleft, is the narrow depression or hollow between the breasts of a woman. The superior portion of cleavage, to a greater or lesser extent, may be fashionably displayed through décolletage – using clothing such as a low-cut neckline to reveal the division. Joseph Breen, head of the U.S. film industry's Production Code Administration, coined the term cleavage when evaluating the 1943 film The Outlaw starring Jane Russell. The term was explained in Time magazine on August 5, 1946. It is most commonly used in the parlance of female fashion of the West to refer to necklines that reveal or emphasize a display of the upper breast area, i.e., the term cleavage is used to describe the low neckline itself, instead of the term décolletage.

The visible display of cleavage can provide erotic pleasure for those who are sexually attracted to women, though this does not occur in all cultures. Explanations for this effect have included evolutionary psychology and dissociation from breastfeeding. Since at least the 15th century, women in the Western world have used their cleavage to flirt, attract, make political statements (such as in the topfreedom movement), and assert power. In several parts of the world, the advent of Christianity and Islam led to a sharp decline in the amount of cleavage which was considered socially acceptable. In some cultures today, cleavage exposure is considered unwelcome, or is even legally banned by law. In the Western world it is often discouraged in daywear or in public spaces. In some cases, exposed cleavage can be a target for unwanted voyeuristic photography or sexual harassment.

Décolletage started becoming popular in the Christian West as it came out of the Early Middle Ages and enjoyed significant prevalence during mid-Tang-era China, Elizabethan-era England, and France over many centuries, particularly after the French Revolution. But in Victorian-era England and during the flapper period of Western fashion, it was suppressed. Cleavage came vigorously back into Western fashion in the 1950s, particularly through Hollywood celebrities and lingerie brands. The consequent fascination with cleavage was most prominent in the U.S., and countries heavily influenced by the U.S. With the advent of push-up and underwired bras that replaced the corsets of the past, the cleavage fascination was propelled by these lingerie manufacturers. By the early 2020s, dramatization of cleavage started to lose popularity along with the big lingerie brands. At the same time cleavage was sometimes replaced with other types of presentation of partially clothed breasts, like "sideboob" and "underboob".

Many women enhance their cleavage through the use of things like brassières, falsies and corsetry, as well as surgical breast augmentation using saline or silicone implants and hormone therapy. Wearing necklaces can also draw attention to exposed cleavage. Workouts, yoga, skin care, makeup, jewelry, tattoos and piercings are also used to embellish the cleavage. Male cleavage (also called by the slang heavage), accentuated by low necklines or unbuttoned shirts, is a film trend in Hollywood and Bollywood. Some men also groom their chests.

== Etymology ==
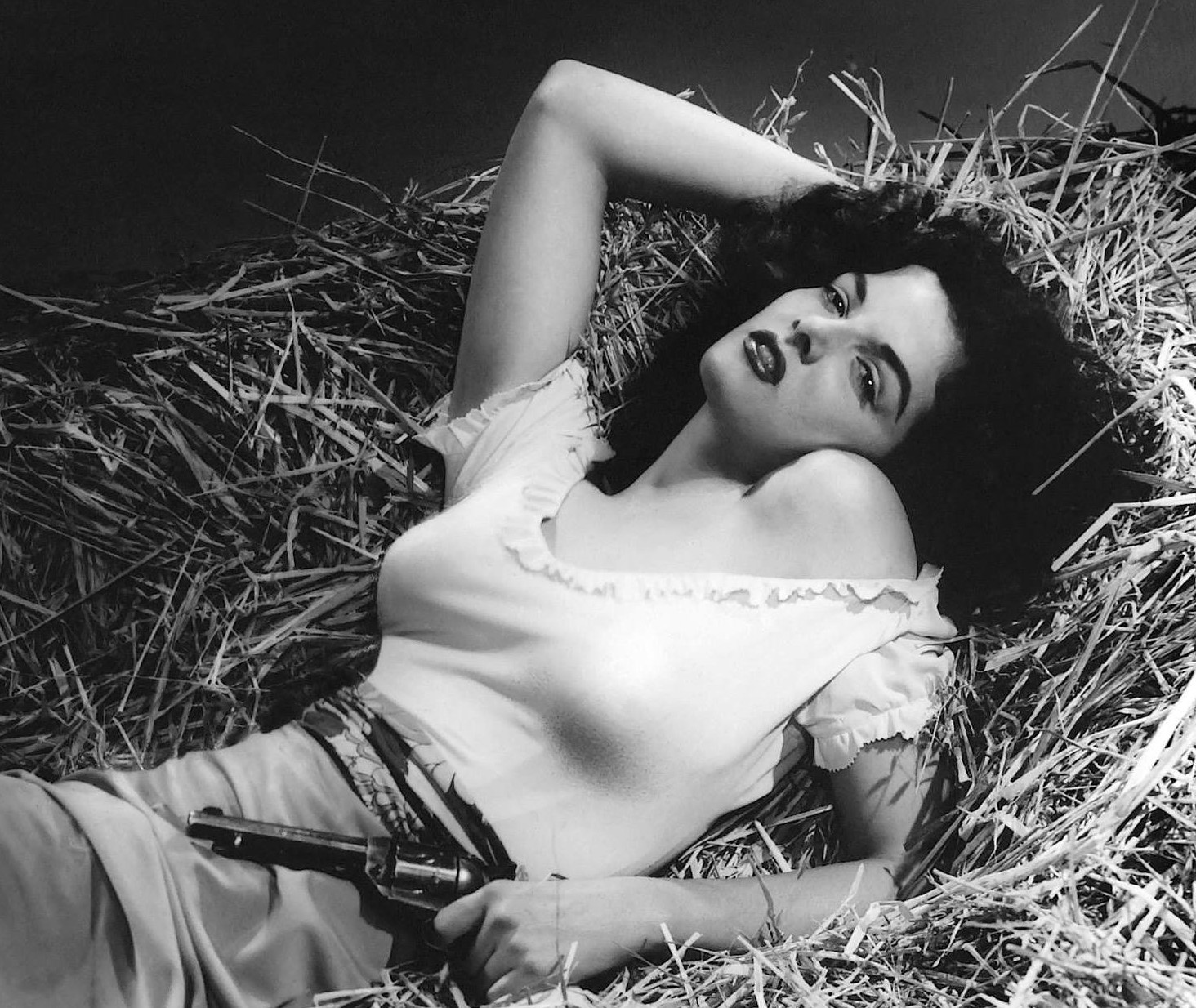
Jane Russell in The Outlaw (1943). Director Howard Hughes' emphasizing of her cleavage prompted the "Hay's Office" of the Motion Picture Producers and Distributors of America to take actions against the film, and make the first use of the term cleavage in association with breasts. Hughes and Russell are considered pioneers of exaggerated cleavage in movies. For the film, Hughes designed a prototype for an underwire bra to allow Russell to show "five and one-quarter inches" of cleavage.

The word cleavage was first used in the early 19th century in geology and mineralogy to mean the tendency of crystals, minerals, and rocks to split along definite planes. By the mid-19th century, it was generally used to mean splitting along a line of division into two or more parts. In the 1940s, Joseph Breen, head of the U.S. Production Code Administration, applied the term to breasts in reference to actor Jane Russell's costumes and poses in the 1943 movie The Outlaw. The term was also applied in the evaluation of the British films The Wicked Lady (1945), starring Margaret Lockwood and Patricia Roc; Bedelia (1946), also starring Lockwood; and Pink String and Sealing Wax (1945), starring Googie Withers. This use of the term was first covered in a Time article titled "Cleavage & the Code" on August 5, 1946, as a "Johnston Office (the popular name for Motion Picture Association of America office at the time) trade term for the shadowed depression dividing an actress' bosom into two distinct sections." The word cleavage is made of the root verb cleave 'to split' (from Old English clifian and Middle English clevien; cleft in the past tense) and the suffix -age 'the state of, the act of'.

While the division of the breasts is a cleavage, the opening of a person's garments to make the division visible is called a décolletage, a French word that is derived from décolleter 'to reveal the neck'. The term was first used in English literature before 1831 and was the preferred term among educated people in the English-speaking world before cleavage became the popular term. Décolletage (or décolleté in adjectival form) refers to the upper part of the female torso, consisting of the neck, shoulders, back and chest, which is exposed by the neckline, the edge of a dress or shirt that goes around the neck, especially at the front of a woman's garment. The neckline and collar are often the most attention-grabbing parts of a garment, effected by bright or contrasting colors, or by décolletage. The term is most commonly applied to a neckline that reveals or emphasizes cleavage and is measured as extending about two hand-breadths from the base of the neck down; both in the front and the back. In anatomical terms, the cleft in the human body between the breasts is known as the intermammary cleft or intermammary sulcus.

== Typology ==
While there has been much work done to classify breasts based on their shapes, contours and sizes, there has not been much work done to classify their cleavage, despite its prominence in aesthetic determination.

== Culture ==
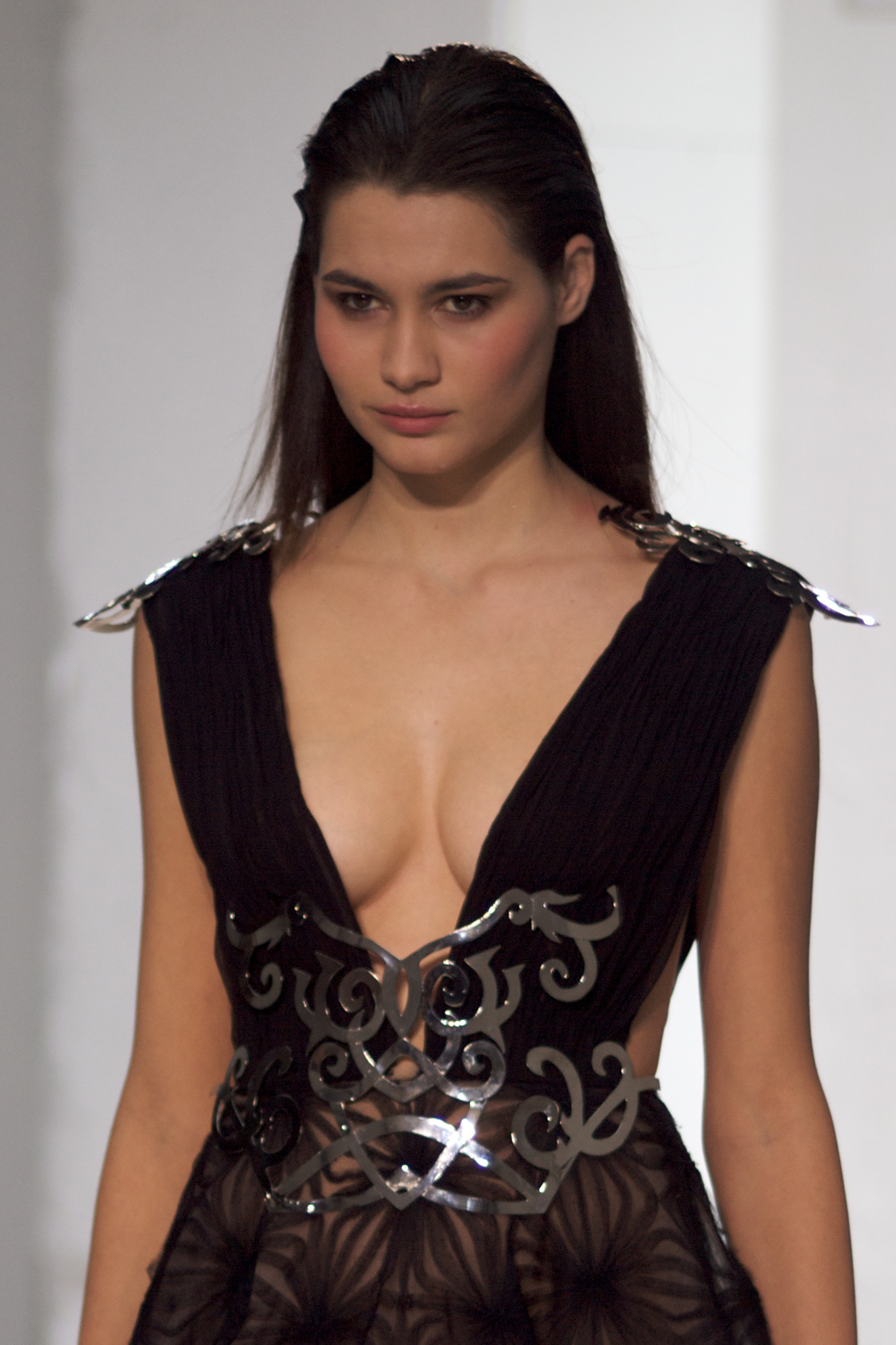
A fashion model in a décolleté gown at a fashion show showing the inner sides of the breasts

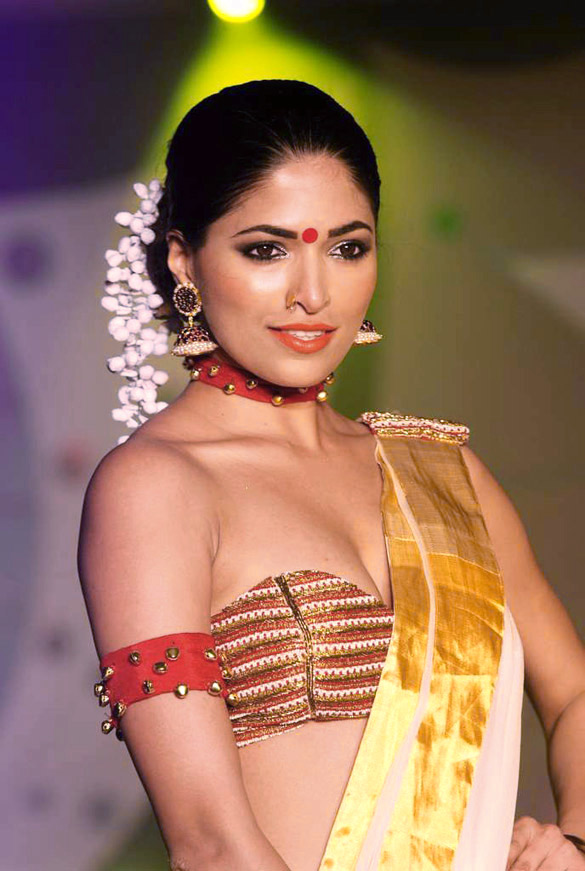
Parvathy Omanakuttan in a décolleté sari at a fashion show

In most cultures, men typically find female breasts attractive. Women sometimes use décolletage that exposes the cleavage to enhance their physical and sexual attractiveness, and to improve their sense of femininity. Display of cleavage with a low neckline is often regarded as a form of flirting or seduction, as much as for its aesthetic or erotic effect. According to Kinsey Reports, most men derive erotic pleasure from seeing a woman's cleavage. When designing costumes, creating shapes that draw attention to the face or the chest helps distract the gaze from body parts that are considered less desirable. Male cross-dressers and trans women often want female-like cleavage to make their bodies look more feminine. Convincing cleavage may distract attention from less-feminine aspects of the appearance and improve the ability to pass as female.

The amount of cleavage exposure that is acceptable in public differs significantly between cultures and societies. In contemporary Western society, the extent to which a woman may expose her breasts depends on the social and cultural context. Displaying any part of the female breast may be considered inappropriate and may be prohibited in some settings, such as workplaces, churches, and schools, while in other spaces, such as parties, beaches and pools, it may be permissible to show as much cleavage as possible. Art historian James Laver noted the changing standards of cleavage are mostly applicable to evening wear rather than to day wear. The exposure of nipples and areolae is almost always considered immodest and in some instances is viewed as indecent exposure.

=== Cultural distribution ===
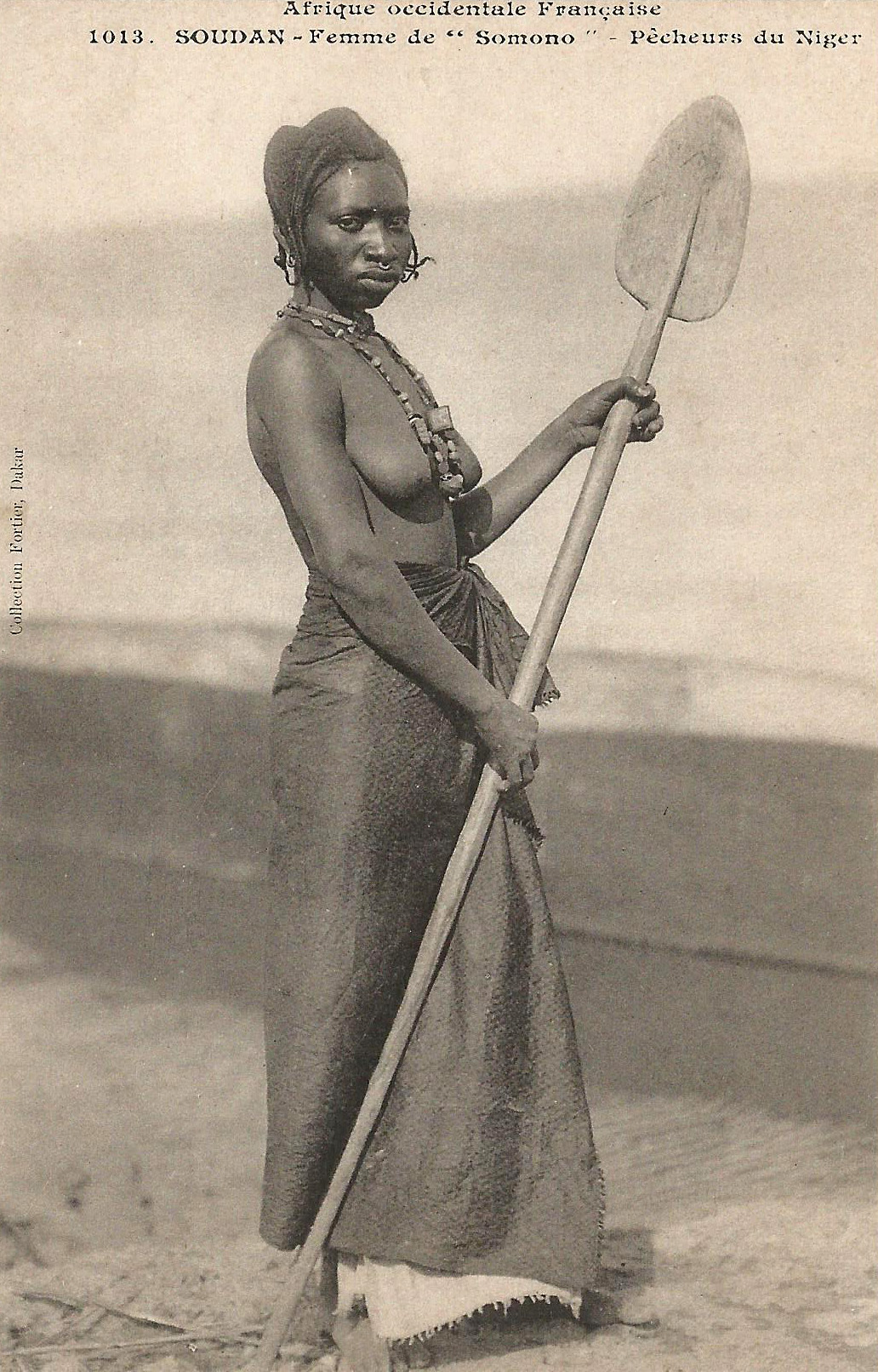
Somono women of Mali do not consider breasts to be sexual

The fascination with female breasts and cleavage is widespread but not universal. It is more prevalent in Western and Westernized cultures, particularly in the U.S. and countries that are heavily influenced by the U.S. Many people in Western culture, both male and female, consider breasts to be an important female secondary sex characteristic and an aspect of femininity. The flaunting of cleavage became an aggressive statement of gender. Films like Erin Brockovich, in which Julia Roberts was required to wear a silicone gel-filled bra to increase her cleavage, demonstrated cleavage as a woman's right and an application of feminine attributes as "a source of power".

Across history and cultures, other parts of women's bodies have sometimes been viewed as more enticing than breasts, including buttocks, legs, necks, ankles, hair, and feet. American anthropologist Clellan S. Ford and ethologist Frank A. Beach said in their 1951 book Patterns of Sexual Behavior that only 13 of 130 cultures in a cross-cultural survey perceived female breasts as sexually attractive. In some cultures, for example in African communities, it is not unusual to see uncovered breasts, which are not considered titillating.

Documentarian Carolyn Latteier said in Jennifer and Laura Berman's TV program All About Breasts, "I interviewed a young anthropologist working with women in Mali, a country in Africa where women go around with bare breasts. They're always feeding their babies. And when she told them that in our culture men are fascinated with breasts there was an instant of shock. According to Rosie Sayers, "Breasts have retained their primary biological function [in Mali] and hold no sexual connotations or stimulus."

Evolutionary psychologist David M. Buss observed that "Americans are probably the most extreme in viewing the breast as a sexual signal." American cultural anthropologist Katherine Ann Dettwyler, editor of Breastfeeding: Biocultural Perspectives, found parallels between the modern American practice of breast enlargement and the past Chinese practice of foot binding. She suggests that both are "culturally sanctioned mutilations of the female body" for the purpose of "male sexual pleasure", and both "compromise a woman's health" and make her body "nonfunctional".

During adolescence, some girls become obsessed with breast shape and cleavage, while others try to resist the growth of their breasts during puberty by binding down their breasts, wearing loose clothes that disguise them or adopting a hunched or stooped posture. A study found that girls whose breasts develop early may be ashamed and embarrassed because of unwanted staring. There is historical evidence that some cultures, including classical antiquity, strongly discouraged cleavage or any hint of a bosom. During the Middle Ages and up to the Renaissance, a woman's stomach was often the central symbol of her sexuality, rather than the breasts. Early English Puritans used a tight bodice to completely flatten breasts, while 17th-century Spaniards put lead plates across the chests of pubescent girls to prevent their bosoms from developing.

=== India ===
In India, women's traditional clothing (saris and cholis) generally exposes more midriff than cleavage. Gagra choli, a dress taken as very chaste in India, also exposes significant amount of midriff and cleavage. Cholis customized for Bollywood movies have particularly deep décolletage. Women of the Bishnoi people wear kanchli blouses with very deep necklines that are embellished with frills and bells to draw attention to their cleavage. Other women wear angia, a small, bikini-like top that is tied at the back with a string, often with the front open enough to show deep cleavage. In late 20th-century India, cleavage became a staple point of attraction in Bollywood movies.

In a 2006 study conducted among young people in Mumbai, both male and female respondents believed that women wearing cleavage-revealing filmi (movie-like) clothes may be more prone to become victims of sexual violence. By the 2010s, Indian men and women wearing décolleté clothes was seen as a fashion statement and not, as in the past, a sign of desperation. At the same time, the allure of on-screen cleavage waned as cleavage-revealing clothes became more commonplace.

=== Islamic view ===
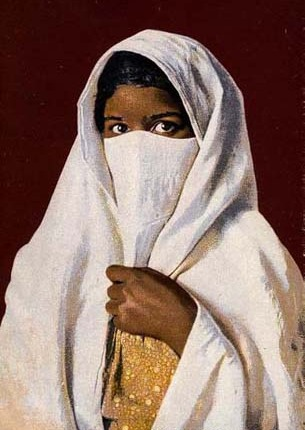
According to Islamic law, Muslim women are required to cover their bosoms.

The Muslim religious dress code for a woman's cleavage is derived from two Quranic verses (ayat) – verse 31, Sura 24 (An-Nūr; Arabic: الْنُّور; "The Light") and verse 59, Surah 33 (Al-Aḥzāb; Arabic: الأحزاب; "The Clans"). Verse 31 of Sura 24 says, "Say to the believing women [...] that they should draw their veils (khumur, s. khimar) over their bosoms (juyub, s. jayb) and not display their beauty".^{[Quran 24:31–32 (Translated by Yusuf Ali)]} Only the mahram (unmarriageable) relatives are exempt from this strict code. Verse 59 of Sura 33 says, "Tell [...] the believing women, that they should cast their outer garments (jalabib, s. jilbāb) over their persons".^{[Quran 33:59–60 (Translated by Yusuf Ali)]} Jilbab and khimar are the only two women's clothing items mentioned in the Quran. Women used to wear clothes that were parted at the front to expose the breasts when the verses were revealed.

These verses were later interpreted as requiring the complete covering of women's bodies. Some Islamic clerics and scholars, including Ibn Taymiyyah, argued that the entire female body is "a shameful part" (awrah) and therefore is to be covered entirely, with a niqab or burqa, centuries after the time of Muhammad. According to Egyptian historian Sayyid-Marsot, male Islamic scholars (ulama, s. alim) since the 18th century started interpreting that a woman's whole body needs to be entirely covered. But as late as in the 1980s, women of the Al-Akhdam (servant) class in Yemen and baladi (folk) women of Egypt still wore cleavage revealing clothes as the Islamic dress codes were not universally applied. In the early 21st century Muslim world, there is a popular consensus that modesty requires coverage of any cleavage.

=== Breastfeeding practices ===
Breastfeeding advocate Maria Miller argued that the American obsession with breasts is caused by American men's and women's unfamiliarity with the extraordinary variety of normal breasts and their ignorance of "what the breast is really for". In Alexandre Guillaume Mouslier de Moissy's 1771 play La Vraie Mère ("The True Mother"), the title character rebukes her husband for treating her as an object for his sexual gratification; "Are your senses so gross as to look on these breasts—the respectable treasures of nature—as merely an embellishment, destined to ornament the chest of women?". In the 18th century, biologists and philosophers like Carl Linnaeus and Jean-Jacques Rousseau attempted to popularize the idea of breastfeeding of one's own children as natural and fashionable.

According to Valerie Steele, director of Fashion Institute of Technology, "For centuries (even in the Judeo-Christian and Islamic worlds), the sight of a woman nursing was accepted as normal. This factor contributed to the fairly rapid acceptance of dresses with low necklines, which were introduced in the fifteenth century." Since emerging in the Christian West, the early décolleté dresses—which were termed by French court historian Jean Froissart as "the smile of the bustline"—had increasingly plunging necklines because the Renaissance celebrated the beauty of the unclothed human body. Moralists, who blamed any number of chest illness on bare cleavage, were shocked by the development.

== Laws ==
As of 2011, women in Saudi Arabia and Afghanistan were required to completely cover their bodies; Iranian law required the wearing of a chador (over-cloak) or a hijab (head scarf), and in Egypt, the exposure of cleavage in the media was considered to be nudity. Various other presentation of clothed breasts, like side cleavage and bottom cleavage, are also regulated by law in some U.S. counties. Both were banned by CBS as "bare sides or under curvature of the breasts is also problematic" at the 55th Annual Grammy Awards in 2013. Underboob was banned in Springfield, Missouri in 2015 after a Free the Nipple rally. Thailand banned selfies showing underboob with provisions for up to five years in jail in 2016. Some women showing excessive cleavage have been reported for sexual harassment.

=== Controversies ===
Despite a long history, display of cleavage can still be controversial. UK women's magazine Stylist in 2017 and Indian newspaper Mid-Day in 2019 reported "cleavage shaming" was commonplace in news and social media. Bollywood actresses Disha Patani, Deepika Padukone, Priyanka Chopra, Nargis Fakhri and others were trolled and shamed for wearing cleavage-baring outfits in social and new media, including in The Times of India. Extraordinary attention was generated when politicians Angela Merkel, Hillary Clinton and Jacqui Smith wore cleavage-revealing outfits, even from media outlets The Washington Post and The New York Times.

At the same time, there also has been reports of passengers of airlines, including Southwest Airlines, Spirit Airlines and EasyJet, were instructed against and evicted for showing "too much cleavage". In 2014, a television series called The Empress of China was taken off-air in China days after its premier because of too much cleavage; the show was aired again after much censorship. In the next year, organizers of ChinaJoy, the largest gaming and digital entertainment exhibition held in China, levied a fine of US$800 on women who revealed "more than two centimeters of cleavage".

Amazon subsidiary Twitch, a live video streaming service, banned underboobs and instructed on the amount of cleavage permissible in 2020.

=== Downblouse ===
"Downblouse" is the act of looking down a woman's dress or top to observe or photograph her cleavage or breasts. It may occur as a form of voyeurism or sexual fetishism. In some jurisdictions it is a sexual offense. The issue has been publicly discussed during the 21st century, although the term downblouse has been used in English since 1994. The popularity of covert downblouse and upskirt photography has increased with the proliferation of camera phones since 2000. NASUWT, a UK teachers' union, reported an upward trend in such pictures at schools in 2018.

Many of these covertly taken pictures are uploaded to websites, as well as subreddits like r/CreepShots. Some websites host tutorials on taking downblouse and upskirt pictures.

As early as 2004, Google listed about four million websites that were tagged with "upskirt" and "downblouse". Some jurisdictions, including the UK, Germany, and a number of American and Australian states, have statutes that prohibit such covert photography. In the UK, people who take such pictures and post them online can be listed on the sex offender registry, and in Japan the government has pressured mobile phone manufacturers to make their phones produce a sound whenever a picture is taken, without a muting option. These types of offenses "largely [go] unreported" and, according to Maria Miller, chair of the Women and Equalities Committee, the legal provisions are inadequate.

== Theories ==
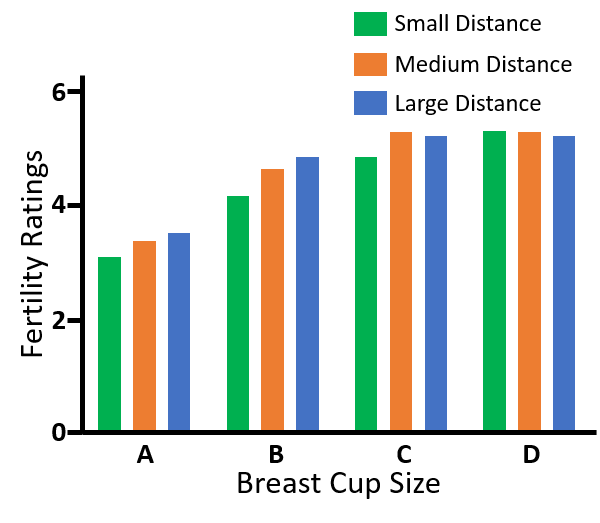
Perceived fertility ratings as a function of breast size and intermammary cleft distance. This was investigated by having participants of both sexes rate manipulated images of female breasts on how fertile they appeared.

Hypothetically, non-paraphilic sexual attraction to breasts is a result of their function as a secondary sex characteristic. The breasts play roles in both sexual pleasure and reproduction. According to the American Psychiatric Association's DSM-5, sexual attraction to breasts is normal unless it is highly atypical and is therefore a form of partialism. According to psychiatrist Larry Young, attraction to breasts "is a brain organization effect that occurs in straight males when they go through puberty." According to sociologist Anthony Joseph Paul Cortese, the cleavage area between the breasts is "perhaps the epicentre" of display of female sexual attractiveness and stimulation of male sexual interest. According to social historian David Kunzle, waist confinement and décolletage are the primary sexualization devices of Western costume. According to music writer Ben Watson in Art, Class and Cleavage (Quartet Books, 1998), the deployment of cleavage punctures through art's "spiritual pretensions" and alerts about the bodily roots of all culture.

Vincenz Czerny, one of the early surgeons to perform a breast surgery, believed the aesthetics of cleavage to be a sign of symmetry and hence beauty. A study published in 2020 found intermammary distance (IMD), or cleavage gap, is one of the major influences on people's perception about a woman's fertility, health and age; accordingly, surgeon Gregory Evans recommends an intermammary distance between 2 and 3 centimetres (0.79 and 1.18 in). Another study found women who display cleavage are more often identified as "voluptuous" than women who do not.

=== Evolutionary perspective ===
Zoologist and ethologist Desmond Morris, author of The Naked Ape, theorized that female human breasts as a sexual signal imitates the cleft between the buttocks that is a prevalent signal among other apes. Evolutionary psychologist David M. Buss explains that female humans evolved to have permanently enlarged mammary glands, unlike all other 222 primates. Functional anatomist Owen Lovejoy ("The origin of man", 1981) suggests, partly based on speculations by Morris, that prominent breasts among female Australopithecines helped attract males and cement the pair-bond necessary for further physical and cultural evolution toward modern humanity.

Evolutionary psychologists theorize humans' permanently enlarged breasts, in contrast to other primates' breasts—which only become enlarged during ovulation—allowed females to "solicit male attention and investment even when they are not really fertile". Hence breast and buttock cleavages, sharing a similarity between their appearances, are considered to be erotic in many societies.

Another school of thought in evolutionary psychology supports the view, that it was 'Nature's plan" to make large-breasted females to appear more attractive to males, because large breasts have an evolutionary advantage in providing breast milk to their off-springs.

=== Historical perspective ===
American cultural anthropologist Katherine Ann Dettwyler, proposed that men are not necessarily biologically drawn to breasts as "humans can learn to view breasts as sexually attractive." Author Elizabeth Gould Davis said breasts, along with phalluses, were revered by the women of Çatalhöyük as instruments of motherhood but after a "patriarchal revolution", when men had appropriated both phallus worship and "the breast fetish" for themselves, these organs "acquired the erotic significance with which they are now endowed". Some scholars argue that it is important that the breast is partly or fully covered to be erotic. French semiotician Roland Barthes observed, "Woman is desexualized at the very moment when she is stripped naked"; while historical commentator Susan L. Stanton observes, "There is no mystery in a naked breast, there is no need to fantasize about what is beneath the clothing."

According to author Marilyn Yalom in A History of the Breast, around these times, male thinkers decided a nursing mother's breasts were both erotic and a source of nourishment for future citizens of the nation. According to psychologist Richard D. McAnulty, when breasts are hypersexualized, they are not perceived as a body part to breastfeed infants. Therefore, exposure of the breast, such as in public breastfeeding, is considered embarrassing. Science journalist Natalie Angier shifts from using the term "functional" to using the term "maternal" to describe the "non-aesthetic breast" in her book Woman: An Intimate Geography (1999). In the same book, she argues human fascination with full cleavage may be a result of our fascination with round objects and attraction towards well-defined curves.

== History ==
=== Ancient ===
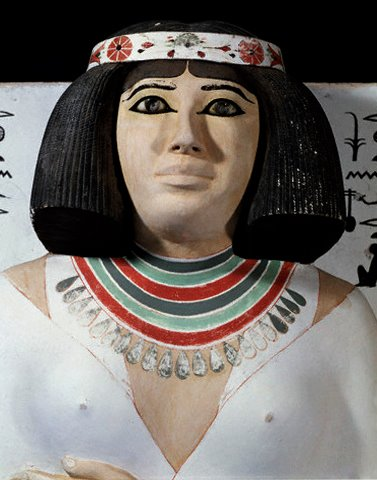
Princess Nofret (27th century BCE) of the Fourth Dynasty of Egypt

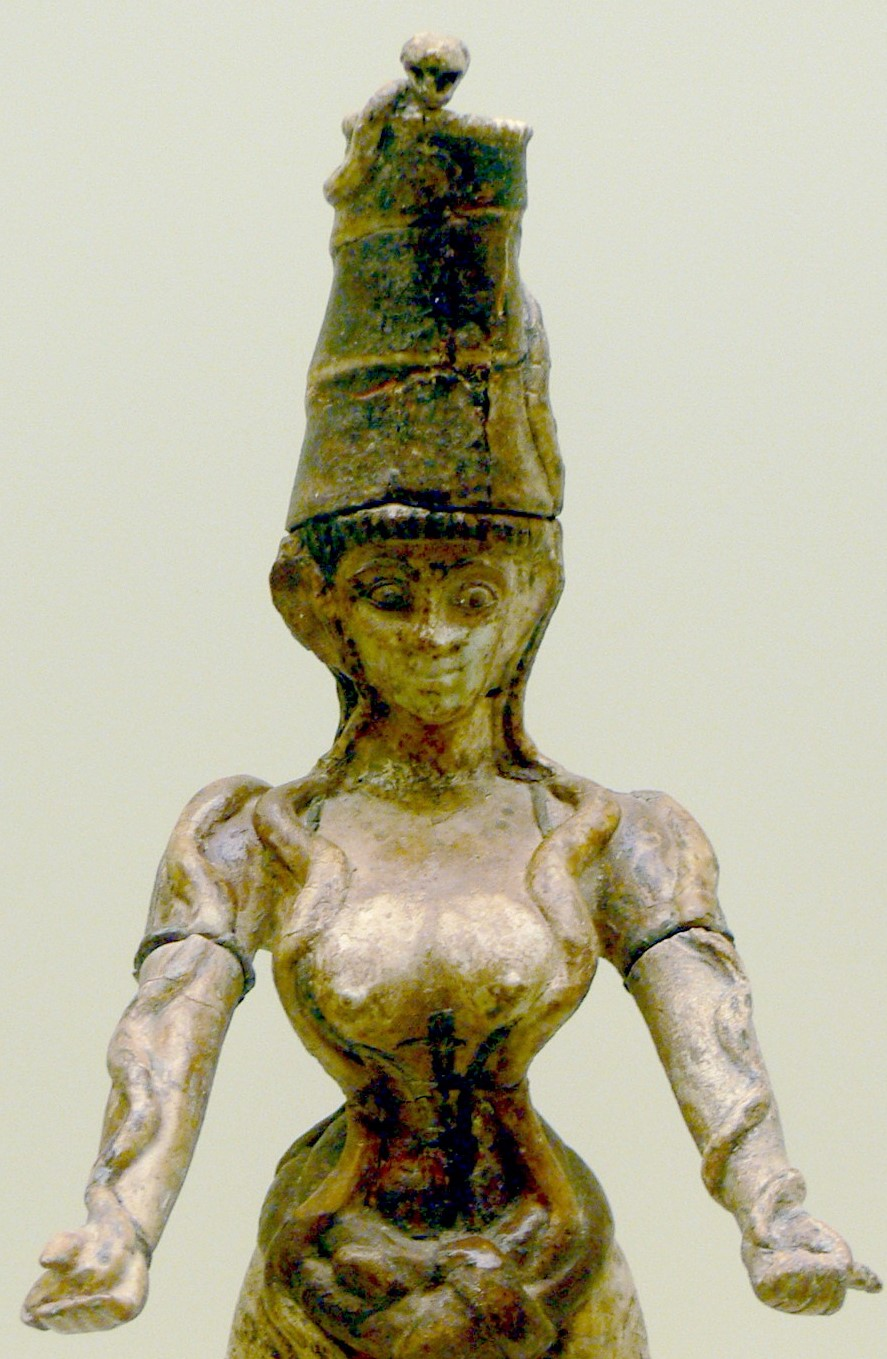
Minoan snake goddess (17th century BCE)

In 2600 BCE, princess Nofret of the Fourth Dynasty of Egypt was depicted wearing a V-neck gown with a plunging neckline that exposed ample cleavage that was further emphasized by an elaborate necklace and prominently protruding nipples.

In ancient Minoan culture, women wore clothes that complemented slim waists and full breasts. One of the better-known features of ancient Minoan fashion is breast exposure; women wore tops that could be arranged to completely cover or expose their breasts, with bodices to accentuate their cleavage. In 1600 BCE, snake goddess figurines with open dress-fronts revealing entire breasts, were sculpted in Minos. By that time, Cretan women in Knossos were wearing ornamental fitted bodices with open cleavage, sometimes with a peplum. Another set of Minoan figurines from 1500 BCE show women in bare-bosomed corsets.

Ancient Greek women adorned their cleavage with a long pendant necklace called a kathema. The ancient Greek goddess Hera is described in the Iliad to have worn something like an early version of a push-up bra festooned with "brooches of gold" and "a hundred tassels" to increase her cleavage to divert Zeus from the Trojan War. Women in Greek and Roman civilizations had at times used breastbands like taenia in Rome to enhance smaller busts but more often, women of the masculine Greco-Roman world, where unisex clothes were often preferred, used breastbands like apodesmes in Greece, and fascia or mamillare in Rome to suppress their breasts. Among these mamillare was a particularly strict leather corset for suppressing women with big busts.

A silver coin that was found in South Arabia in the 3rd century BCE shows a buxom foreign ruler with much décolletage and an elaborate coiffure. Rabbi Aha b. Raba (c. 5th century) and Nathan the Babylonian (c. 2nd century) measured the appropriate size of the cleavage as "of one hand-breadth between a woman's breasts".

=== Medieval ===
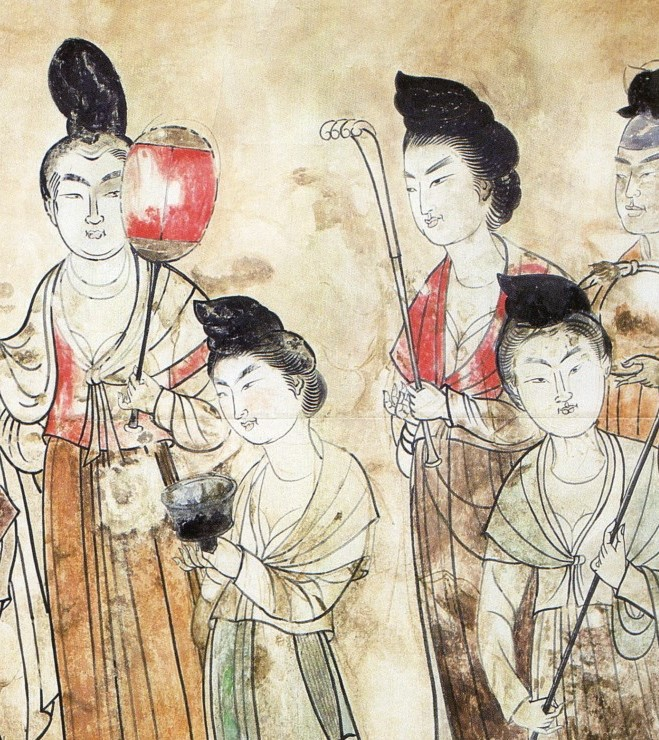
Courtiers in China during the Tang dynasty (c. 706), when the décolletage was quite liberal. 2014 Chinese TV series The Empress of China was briefly pulled off-air for showing the abundance of cleavage in Tang courts.

During the Tang dynasty (7th to 9th centuries), women in China were increasingly freer than before and by the mid-Tang, their décolleté dresses became quite liberated. The Tang women inherited the traditional ruqun gown and modified it by opening up the collar to expose their cleavage, which had previously been unimaginable. Rather than the conservative garments worn by earlier Chinese women, women of the Tang era deliberately emphasized their cleavage. The popular style of the era was long gowns of soft fabrics that were cut with a pronounced décolletage and very wide sleeves, or a décolleté knee-length gown that was worn over a skirt.

Between the 11th and 16th centuries, the prevailing décolleté clothes of women of Punjab, Gujarat and Rajasthan in India were replaced with covered bosoms and long veils as the region increasingly came under foreign control. During this period, elaborate, opulent courtly dresses with wide décolletage became popular in the Italian maritime states of Venice, Genoa and Florence.

Until the 12th century, the Christian West was not cleavage-friendly but a change in attitude occurred by the 14th century with France leading the way, when necklines were lowered, clothes were tightened, and breasts were once again flaunted. Décolleté gowns were introduced in the 15th century. In a breast-rating system that was invented at the time, the highest rating was given to breasts that were "small, white, round like apples, hard, firm, and wide apart".

Women started squeezing the breasts and applying makeup to make their cleavage more attractive; cleavage was termed the "smile of the bustline" by contemporaneous Belgian chronicler Jean Froissart. A contemporaneous French courtesy manual La Clef d'Amors advised, "If you have a beautiful chest and a beautiful neck do not cover them up but your dress should be low cut so that everyone can gaze and gape after them". Contemporaneous poet Eustache Deschamps advised "a wide-open neckline and a tight dress with slits through which the breasts and the throat could be more visible".

The French Catholic Church, however, tried to discourage the flaunting of cleavage. It mandated the cleavage, which it referred to as "the gates of hell", and the opening on woman's bodices be laced. French priest Oliver Maillard said women who exposed their breasts would be "strung up in hell by their udders". Monarchs like Charles VII of France ignored the church. It was common for women in his court to wear bodices through which their breasts, cleavage and nipples could be seen. In 1450, Agnès Sorel, mistress to Charles VII, started a fashion trend when she wore deep, low, square décolleté gowns with fully bared breasts in the French court.

=== Early modern ===
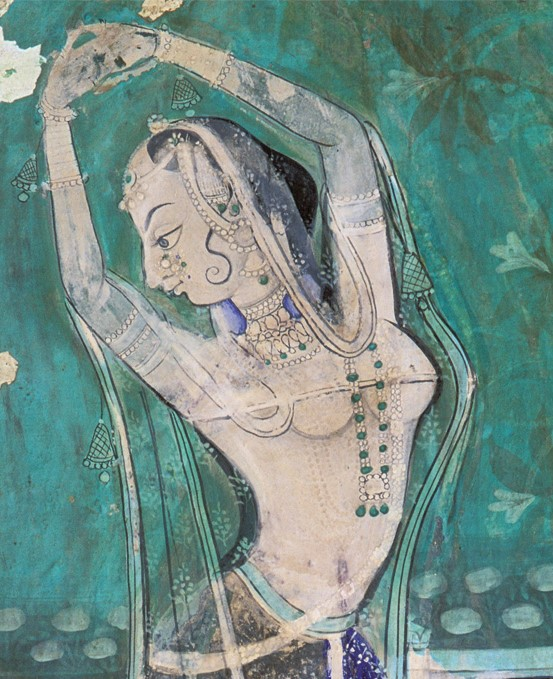
Rajput painting of Chitrashala Dancer from Bundi (c. 1640s) showing exposed underboob, which remained banned by laws and policies as late as 2020 in many places from the U.S. to Thailand

Across Europe, décolletage was often a feature of the dress of the late Middle Ages; this continued through the Victorian period. Gowns that exposed a woman's neck and the top of her chest were very common and uncontroversial in Europe from at least the 11th century until the mid-19th century. Ball gowns and evening gowns especially had low, square décolletage that was designed to display and emphasize cleavage.

In many European societies between the Renaissance and the 19th century, wearing low-cut dresses that exposed one or both breasts was more acceptable than it is in the early 21st century; bared female legs, ankles and shoulders were considered to be more risqué than exposed breasts.

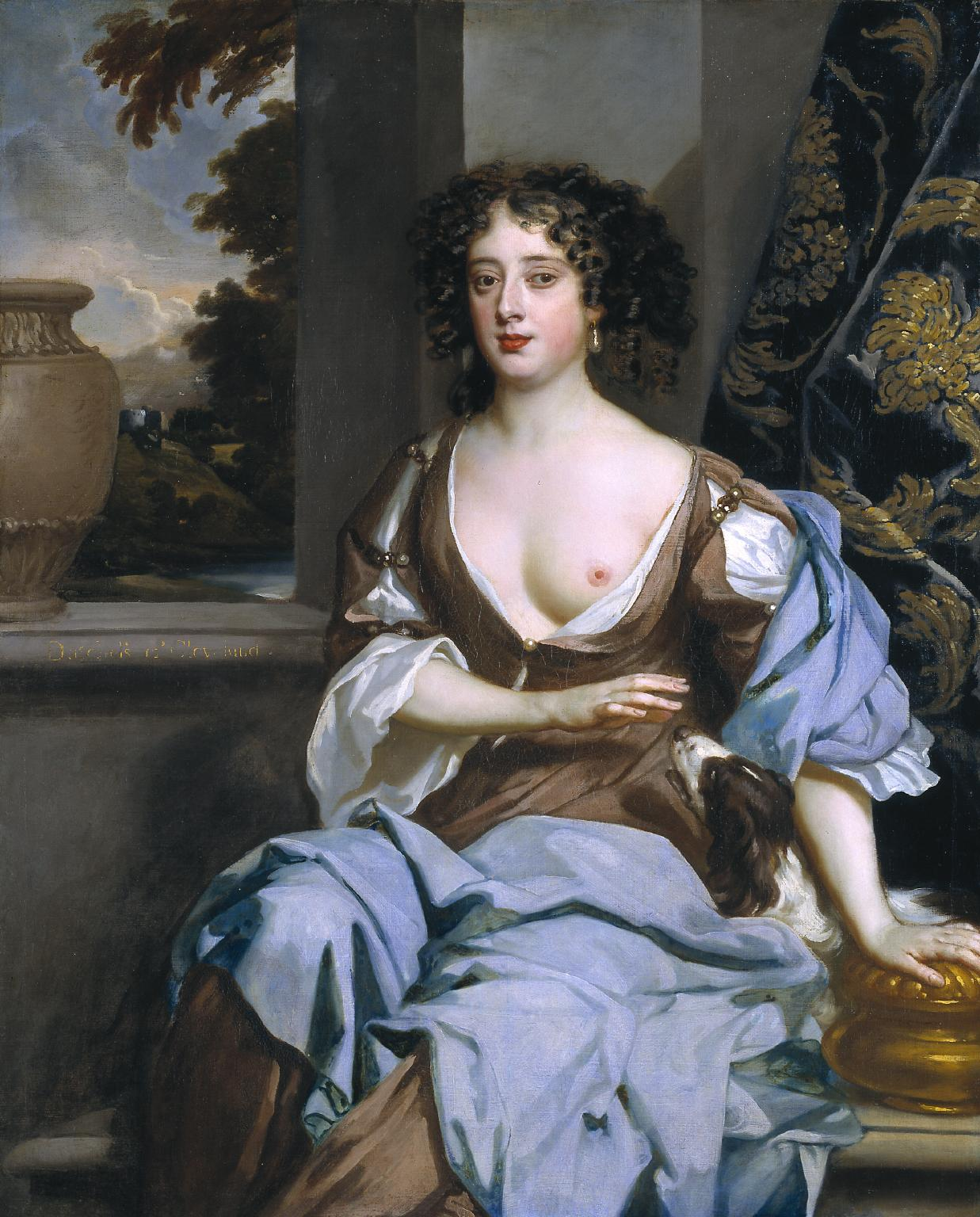
Portrait of an unknown woman, with breast exposed, c. 1670 by Peter Lely

In aristocratic and upper-class circles, the display of breasts was at times regarded as a status symbol; a sign of beauty, wealth and social position. The bared breast invoked associations with nude sculptures of classical Greece that influenced the art, sculpture and architecture of the period.

In mid-16th-century Turkey, during the reign of Suleiman the Magnificent, respectability regulations allowed "respectable" women to wear fashionable dresses with exposed cleavage; this privilege was denied to "prostitutes" so they could not draw attention to their livelihoods. The entari, a popular women's garment of the Ottoman Empire, resembled the corseted bodice of Europe without the corset; its narrow top and narrow, long, plunging décolletage exposed a generous cleavage. Around this time, cleavage-revealing gambaz gowns became accepted among married women in the Levant, where bosoms were regarded as a sign of maternity.

In 16th-century India, during the Mughal Empire, Hindu women started emulating the overdressed conquerors by covering their shoulders and breasts, though in contemporaneous paintings, women of Mughal palaces were often portrayed wearing Rajput-style cholis and breast jewelry. Mughal paintings often portrayed women with extraordinarily daring décolletage. Contemporaneous Rajput paintings often depict women wearing semi-transparent cholis that cover only the upper part of their breasts. In the 16th century, when Spanish conquistadors colonized the Inca Empire, traditional cleavage-revealing and colorful Inca dresses were replaced by high necks and covered bosoms.

In European societies during the 16th century, women's fashions with exposed breasts were common across the class spectrum. Anne of Brittany has been painted wearing a dress with a square neckline. Low, square décolleté styles were popular in 17th-century England; Queen Mary II and Henrietta Maria, wife of Charles I of England, were depicted with widely bared breasts. Architect Inigo Jones designed a masque costume for Henrietta Maria that widely revealed both of her breasts. Cleavage-enhancing corsets, which used whalebone and other stiff materials to create a desired silhouette—a fashion that was also adopted by men for their coats—were introduced in the mid-16th century.

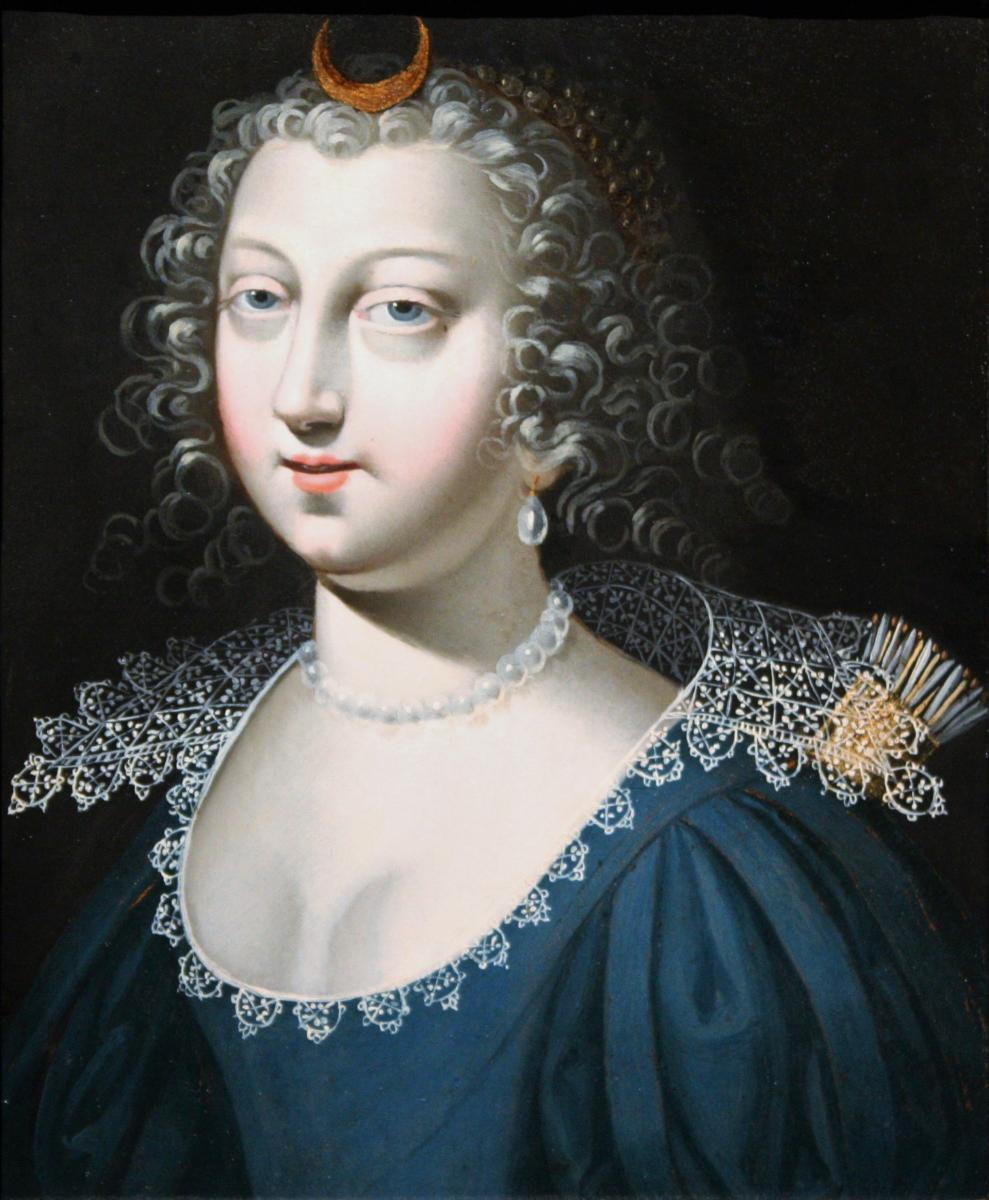
Anne of Austria, Queen of France, was an early 17th century fashion icon wearing dresses that showcased her cleavage.

Throughout the 16th century, shoulder straps stayed on the shoulders but as the 17th century progressed, they moved down the shoulders and across the top of the arms, and by the mid-17th century, the oval neckline of the period became commonplace. By the end of the century, necklines at the front of women's garments started to drop even lower. During the extreme décolletage of the Elizabethan era, necklines were often decorated with frills and strings of pearls, and were sometimes covered with tuckers and partlets (called a tasselo in Italy and la modiste in France). Late Elizabethan corsets, with their rigid, suppressive fronts, manipulated a woman's figure into a flat, cylindrical silhouette with a deep cleavage.

Around 1610, flat collars started replacing neck trims, allowing provocative cleavage that was sometimes covered with a handkerchief. During the Georgian era, pendants became popular as décolletage decoration. Anne of Austria, along with female members of her court, was known for wearing very tight bodices and corsets that forced breasts together to make deeper cleavage, very low necklines that exposed breasts almost in entirety above the areolae, and pendants lying on the cleavage to highlight it. After the French Revolution décolletage become larger at the front and reduced at the back. During the fashions of 1795–1820, many women wore dresses that bared necks, bosoms and shoulders. Increasingly, the amount of décolletage became a major difference between day-wear and formal gowns.

Cleavage was not without controversy. In 1713, British newspaper The Guardian complained about women forgoing their tuckers, and keeping their necks and tops of breasts uncovered. English poet and essayist Joseph Addison complained about décolletage so extreme "the neck of a fine woman at present take in almost half the body". Publications advised women against "unmasking their beauties". 18th-century news correspondents wrote that "otherwise polite, genteel women looked like common prostitutes".

During the French Enlightenment, there was a debate about whether female breasts were merely a sensual enticement or a natural gift to be offered from mother to child. Not all women in France wore the open-neck style without modifications; a self-portrait by Adélaïde Labille-Guiard (France, 1785) shows the painter in a fashionable décolleté dress while her pupils have their bosoms accessorized with gauzy handkerchiefs. Nearly a century later, also in France, a man from the provinces who attended a court ball at the Tuileries in Paris in 1855 was disgusted by the décolleté dresses and is said to have said; "I haven't seen anything like that since I was weaned!". In 1890, the first breast augmentation was performed using an injection of liquid paraffin.

=== Late modern ===
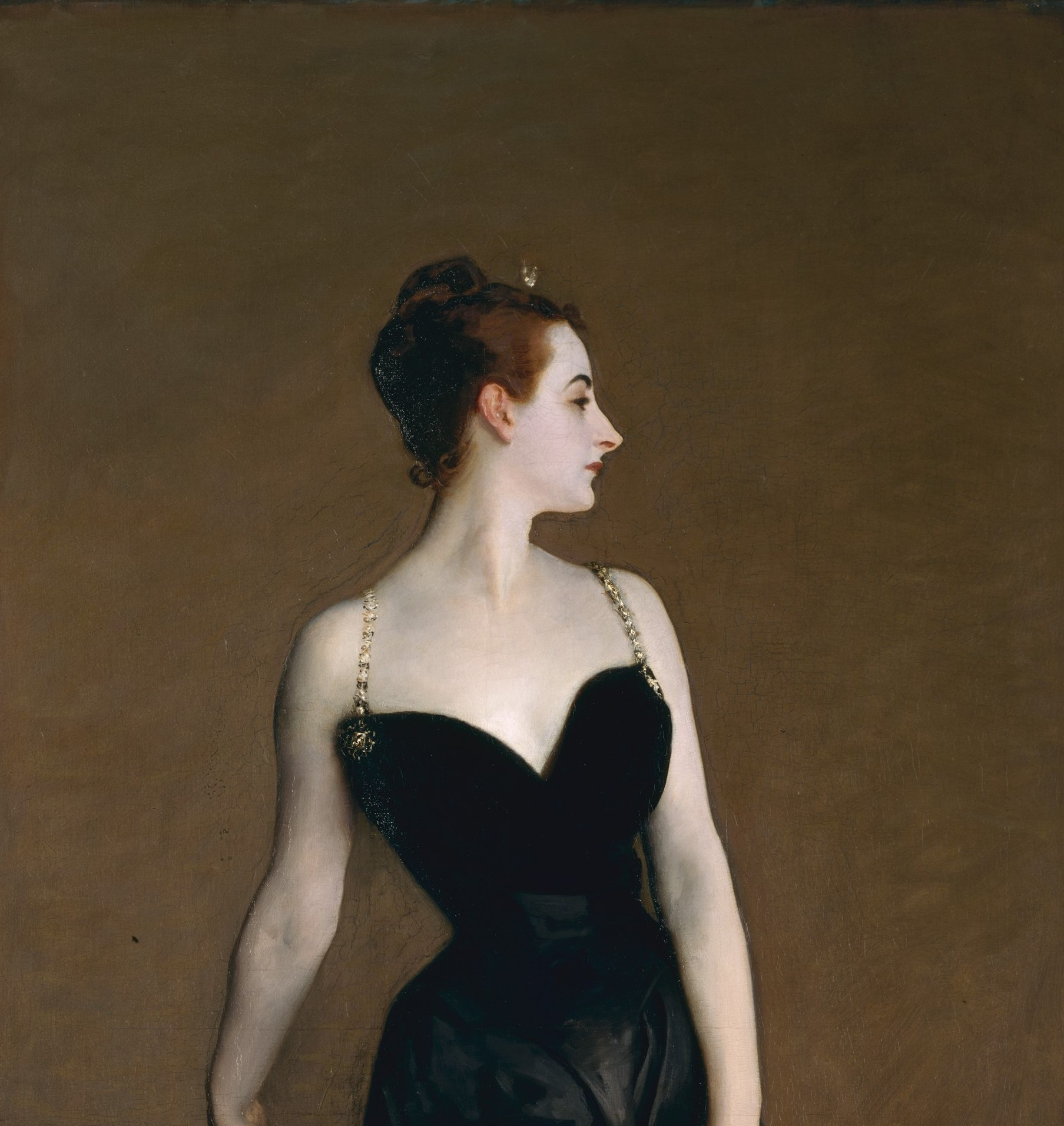
Detail of Portrait of Madame X (1884) by John Singer Sargent, whose cleavage caused enough controversy for Sargent to re-paint and make the cleavage less daring.

By the end of the 18th century in Continental Europe, cleavage-enhancing corsets grew more dramatic, pushing the breasts upward. The tight lacing of corsets worn in the 19th and early 20th centuries emphasized both cleavage and the size of the bust and hips. Evening gowns and ball gowns were especially designed to display and emphasize the décolletage. Elaborate necklaces decorated the décolletage at parties and balls by 1849. There was also a trend of wearing camisole-like clothes and whale-bone corsets that gave the wearer a bust without a separation or any cleavage. Despite the contemporaneous popularity of décolletage dresses, complete exposure of breasts in portraits was limited to two groups of women; the scandalous (mistresses and prostitutes), and the pure (breastfeeding mothers and queens). In North America, the Gilded Age saw women adorning their cleavage with flowers attached to clothes and carefully placed jewelry.

During the Victorian period of the mid-to-late 19th century, social attitudes required women to cover their bosoms in public. High collars were the norm for ordinary wear. Towards the end of this period, the full collar was in fashion, though some décolleté dresses were worn on formal occasions. For that purpose, the Bertha neckline, which lay below the shoulders and was often trimmed with three to six inches (7.6 to 15.2 cm) of lace or other decorative material, became popular with upper and middle-class women but it was socially unacceptable for working-class women to expose that much skin. Multiple pearl necklaces were worn to cover the décolletage. Along with the Bertha neckline, straps were removed from corsets and shawls were made essential.

By 1904, necklines of evening attire were lowered, exposing the shoulders, sometimes without straps but the neckline still ended above the cleavage. Clergymen all over the world were shocked when dresses with modest round or V-shaped necklines became fashionable around 1913. In the German Empire, Roman Catholic bishops joined to issue a pastoral letter attacking the new fashions. In the Edwardian era, extreme uplift with no hint of cleavage was as common as a bow-fronted look that was also popular. In 1908, a single rubber pad or a "bust form" was worn inside the front of the bodice to make cleavage virtually undetectable.

The Flapper generation of 1920s flattened their chests to adopt the fashionable "boy-girl" look by either bandaging their breasts or by using bust flatteners. Corsets started to go out of fashion by 1917, when metal was needed to make tanks and munitions for World War I and due to the vogue for boyish figures. In New Zealand, the early appearance of décolleté clothes in 1914 was soon superseded by the "flat" fashion. Breast suppression prevailed in the Western world so much the U.S. physician Lillian Farrar attributed "virginal atrophic prolapsed breasts" to the fashion imperatives of the time. In 1920, paraffin was replaced for breast augmentation with fatty tissue taken from the abdomen and buttocks.

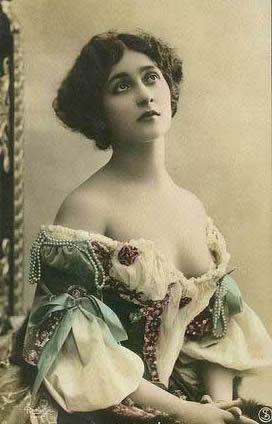
Italian soprano Lina Cavalieri, known for her décolletage as much as her talent, at the turn of the 20th century.

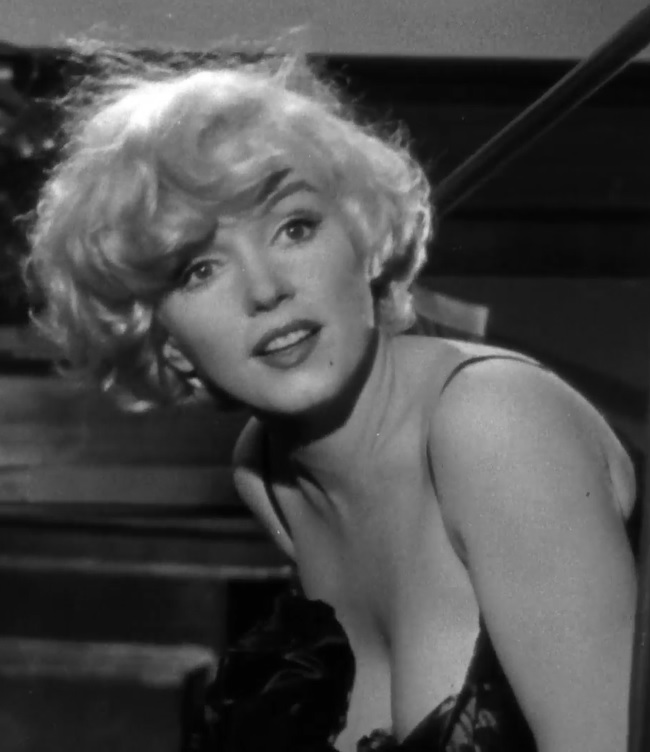
Marilyn Monroe, in Some Like It Hot (1959). In a poll of 1,000 Debenhams customers purchasing large bras, Monroe was voted to have the best cleavage of any famous woman.

In 1914, New York socialite Mary Phelps Jacob (better known as Caresse Crosby) patented the garment as "the backless brassiere"; after making a few hundred garments, she sold the patent to The Warner Brothers Corset Company for US$1,500. In the next 30 years, Warner Brothers made more than US$15 million from Jacob's design. During the next century, the brassière industry went through many ups and downs, often influenced by the demand for cleavage.

With a return to more womanly figures in the 1930s, corsetry maintained a strong demand, even at the height of the Great Depression. From the 1920s to the 1940s, corset manufacturers constantly tried training young women to use corsets but fashions became more restrained in terms of décolletage while exposure of the leg became more accepted in Western societies during World War I and remained so for nearly half a century. In the Republic of China in the early 20th century, qipao, a dress that shows the legs but no cleavage, became so popular many Chinese women consider it as their national dress.

In the 1940s, a substantial amount of fabric in the center of brassières created a separation of breasts rather than a pushed-together cleavage. In 1947, Frederick Mellinger of Frederick's of Hollywood created the first padded brassière followed a year later by an early push-up version dubbed "The Rising Star". In that decade, Christian Dior introduced the "New Look" that included elastic corsets, pads and shaping girdles to widen hips, cinch waists and lift breasts.

Under the Motion Picture Production Code, which was in effect in the U.S. between 1934 and 1968, the depiction of excessive cleavage was not permitted. Many female actors defied those standards; other celebrities, performers and models followed suit and the public was not far behind. Low-cut styles of various depths were common. In the post-war period, cleavage became a defining emblem; according to writer Peter Lewis; "The bust, bosom or cleavage was in the Fifties the apotheosis of erogenous zones. The breasts were the apples of all eyes." Around this time, the American word "cleavage" started to be used to define the space between the breasts.

=== Early contemporary ===
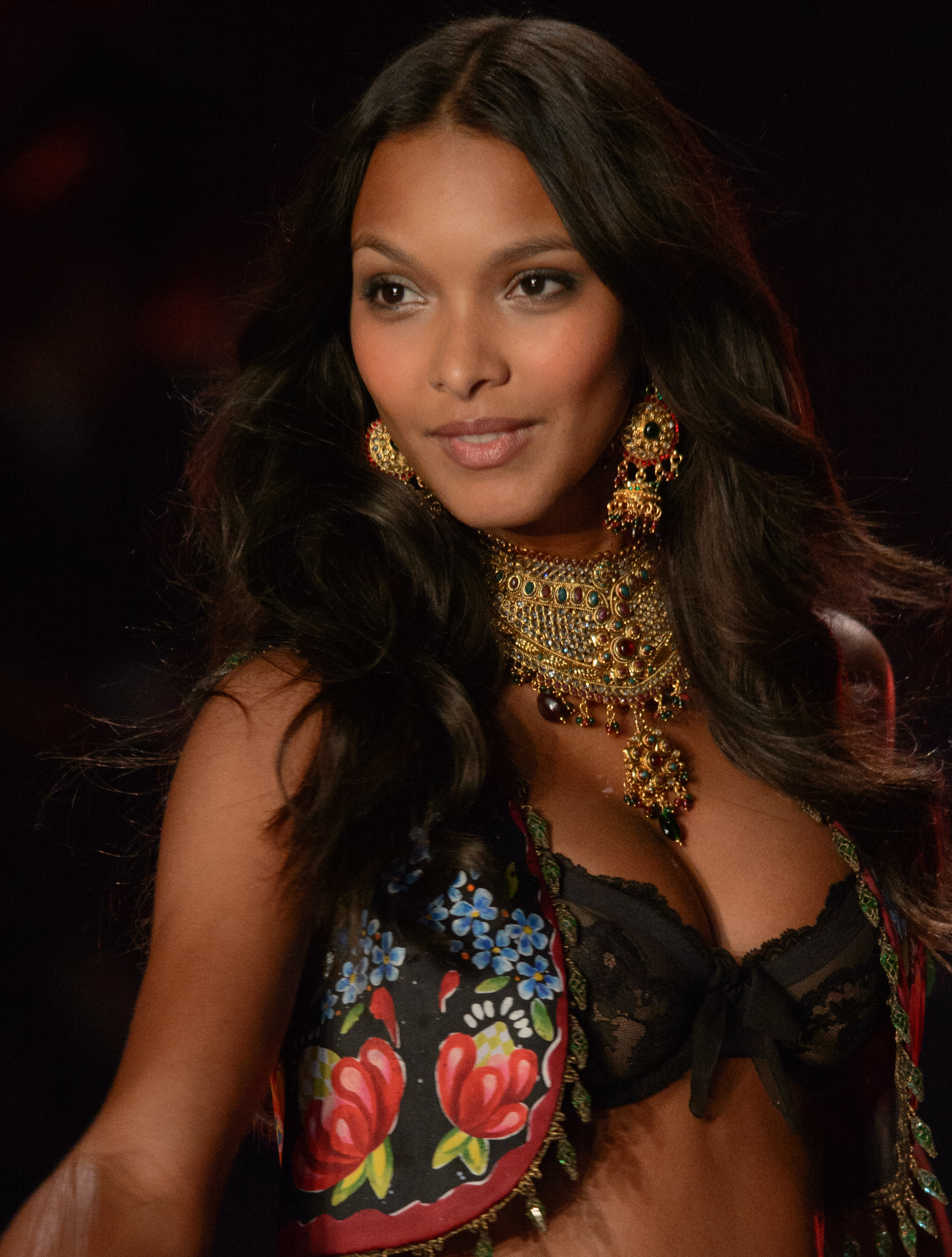
Lais Ribeiro at a Victoria's Secret fashion show. Lingerie manufacturers controlled and constructed the conventional bustline of the 1990s. In their heyday, Wonderbra sponsored a National Cleavage Day in South Africa every year and the webcast of the Victoria's Secret fashion show became one of the Internet's biggest events.

According to an urban American woman, during the 1950s, "At night... our shoulders were naked, our breasts half-bare". Dramatic necklaces that emphasized the cleavage became popular at balls and parties in France. In the U.S., television shows tried to mask exposed cleavage with tulle and even sketches, illustrations and short stories in Reader's Digest and Saturday Evening Post depicted women with tiny waists, big buttocks and ample cleavage. In this decade, Hollywood and the fashion industry successfully promoted large, cloven bustlines and falsies, the brassière industry started experimenting with the half-cup bra (also known as demi-cup or shelf bra) to facilitate décolletage. Polyvinyl sacs were often the preferred implant to augment breasts into a fuller, more projected appearance.

Despite these developments, open presentation of cleavage was mostly limited to well-endowed female actors like Lana Turner, Marilyn Monroe (who was attributed with the revelation of America's "mammary madness" by journalist Marjorie Rosen), Rita Hayworth, Jane Russell, Brigitte Bardot, Jayne Mansfield and Sophia Loren, who were as celebrated for their cleavage as for their beauty. While these movie stars significantly influenced the appearance of women's busts in this decade, the stylish 1950s sweaters were a safer substitute for many women. Lingerie manufacturer Berlei launched the "Hollywood Maxwell" brassière, claiming it to be a "favourite of film stars".

Modern augmentation mammaplasty began when Thomas Cronin and Frank Gerow developed the first silicone gel-filled breast prosthesis with Dow Corning Corporation, and the first implanting operation took place the following year. In the late 1960s, attention began to shift from the large bust to the trim lower torso, reasserting the need to diet, especially as new clothing fashions—brief, sheer, and close fitting—prohibited heavy reliance on foundation lingerie. Legs were comparatively less emphasized as elements of beauty.

In the 1960s, driven by second-wave feminism, liberal politics and the free love movement, a bra burning movement arose to protest against—among various patriarchal imperatives—constructed cleavage and disciplined breasts. Yves Saint Laurent and U.S. designer Rudi Gernreich experimented with a bra-less look on the runway. The increasingly casual styles of the 1960s led to a bra-less look when women who were unwilling to give up bras turned to soft bras that did not lift and "were as light and discreet as possible" but still provided support.

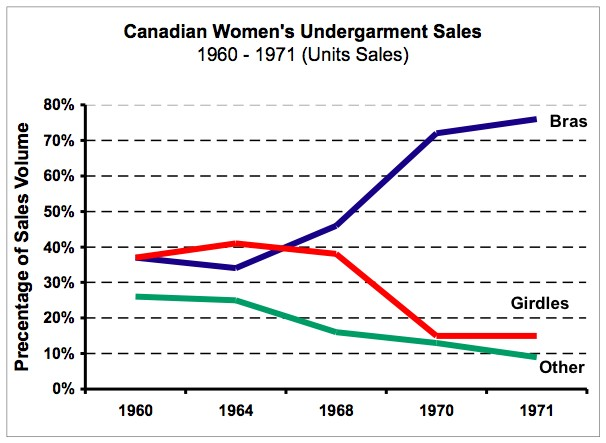
Canadian government industry statistics (during the period sales figures were compiled by Industry Canada), panties were considered "lingerie," rather than so-called "foundation undergarments" and are not part of this data set.

From the 1960s, changes in fashion leaned towards increased displays of cleavage in films and television; Jane Russell and Elizabeth Taylor were the biggest stars who led the fashion. In everyday life, low-cut dress styles became common, even for casual wear. Lingerie and shapewear manufacturers like Warner Brothers, Gossard, Formfit and Bali took the opportunity to market plunge bras with a lower gore that was suitable for low-cut styles.

In the early 1970s, it became common to leave top buttons on shirts and blouses open to display pectoral muscles and cleavage. Daring women and men of all ages wore tailored, buttoned-down shirts that were open from the breast-point to the navel in a "groovy" style, with pendants, beads or medallions dangling on the chest, displaying a firm body achieved through exercise. As a new masculine style evolved, gay men adopted a traditionally masculine or working-class style with "half-unbuttoned shirt above the sweaty chest" and tight jeans.

During the 1980s, deep, plunging cleavage became more common and less risqué as the popularity of work-outs and masculine shoulder-padded blazers increased. In 1985, designer Vivienne Westwood re-introduced the corset as a trendy way to enhance cleavage. It was followed in 1989 by Jean Paul Gaultier, who dressed Madonna in a pink corset. Soon, Westwood introduced an elastic-sided variant that worked as a balcony to push up the cleavage.

The push-up bra and exaggerated cleavage became popular in the 1990s. In 1992, the bra and girdle industry in America posted sales of over US$1 billion. The Wonderbra brand, which had existed elsewhere, entered the U.S. market in 1994 with a newly designed, cleavage-enhancing bra. Driven by a controversial advertising campaign that featured model Eva Herzigova's cleavage, one Wonderbra was sold every 15 seconds shortly after the brand's launch, leading to first-year sales of US$120 million. The hypersexualized styles of Victoria's Secret became a "zeitgeist" in the 1990s. By 2013, Victoria's Secret had captured one-third of the women's underwear market in the U.S. In the early 1990s, Sara Lee Corporation — then owner of the Wonderbra and Playtex brands — along with UK lingerie manufacturer Gossard Limited, introduced a bra for Asian women who, according to Sara Lee, are "less buxom [and have] narrower shoulders". Traditional brands like Maidenform produced similar styles.

=== Late contemporary ===
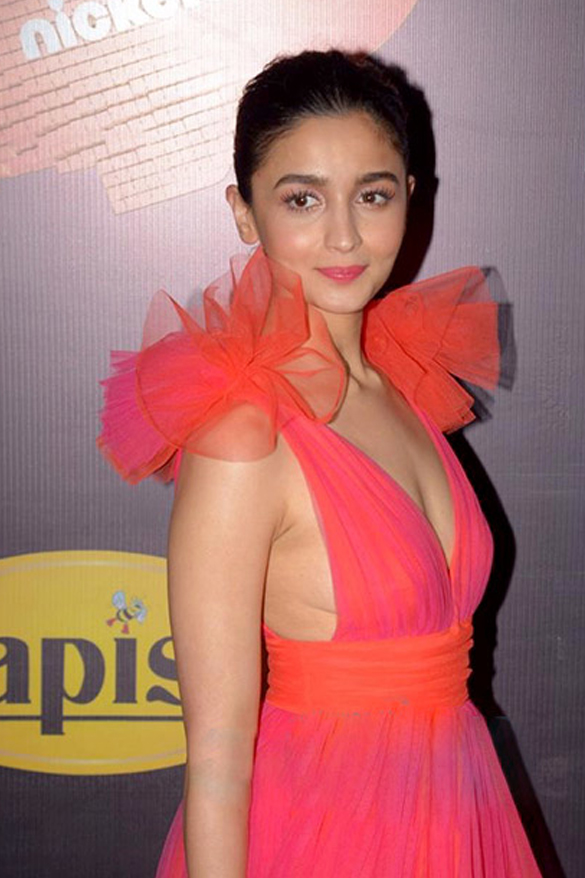
Bollywood actress Alia Bhatt wearing a sideboob gown

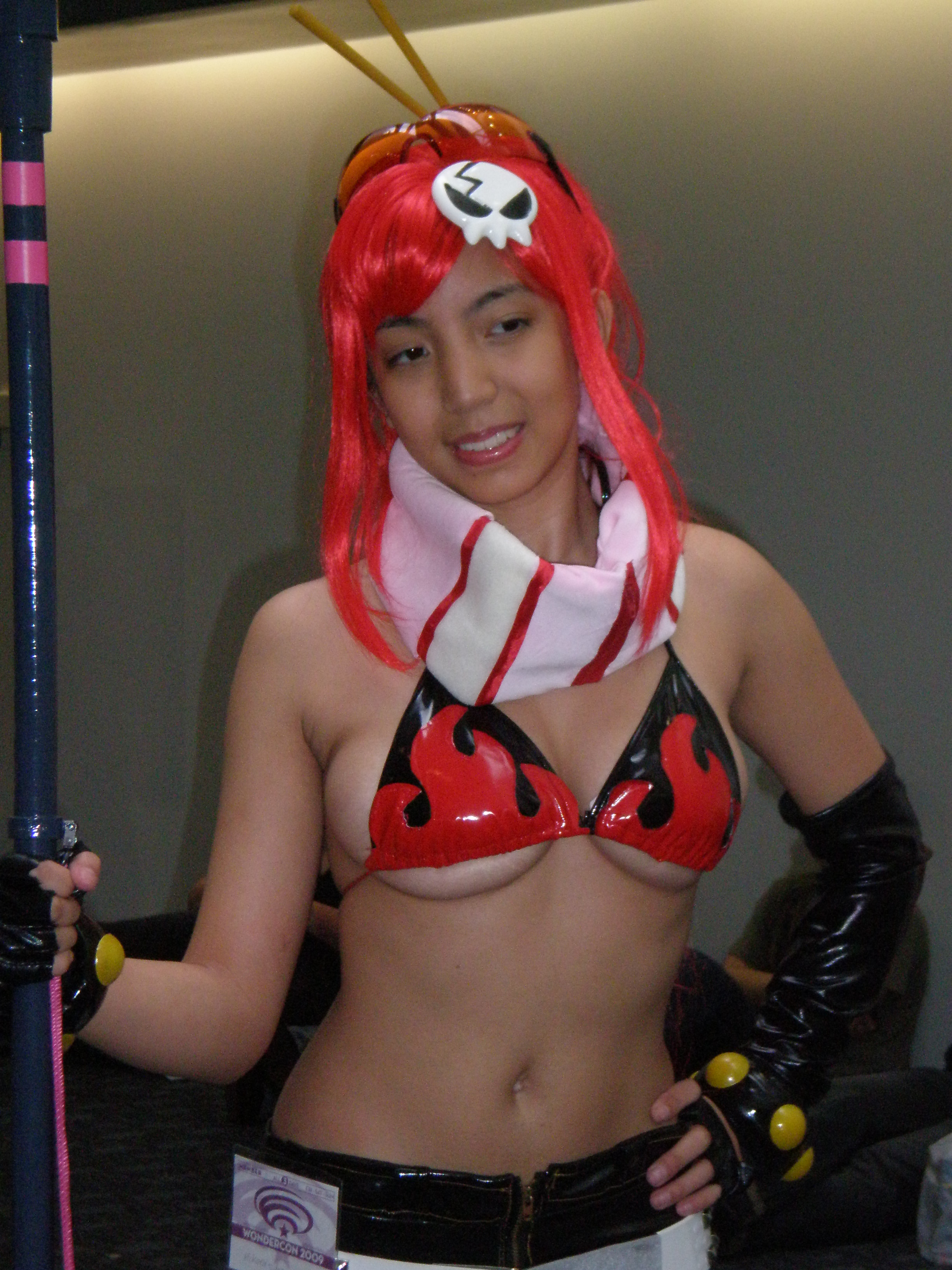
Cosplayer dressing as Yoko Littner in an underboob bikini top

Underwire bras, the most popular cleavage-boosting lingerie, accounted for 60% of the UK bra market in 2000 and 70% in 2005. About 70% of women who wear bras wear a steel underwire bra according to underwear manufacturer S&S Industries of New York in 2009. In 2001, 70% (350 million) of the bras sold in the U.S. were underwire bras. As of 2005, underwire bras were the fastest-growing segment of the market.

Corsets also experienced a resurgence in the 2010s; this trend was driven by photographs on social media. According to fashion historian Valerie Steele, "The corset did not so much disappear as become internalised through diet, exercise and plastic surgery". By the turn of the 21st century, some of the attention given to cleavage and breasts started to shift to buttocks, especially in the media, while corsetry returned to mainstream fashion. According to dietician Rebecca Scritchfield, the resurgent popularity of corsets is driven by "the picture on Instagram of somebody with a tiny waist and giant boobs". At the same time alternatives to décolletage, which were often still called cleavages, emerged from Western cleavage culture.

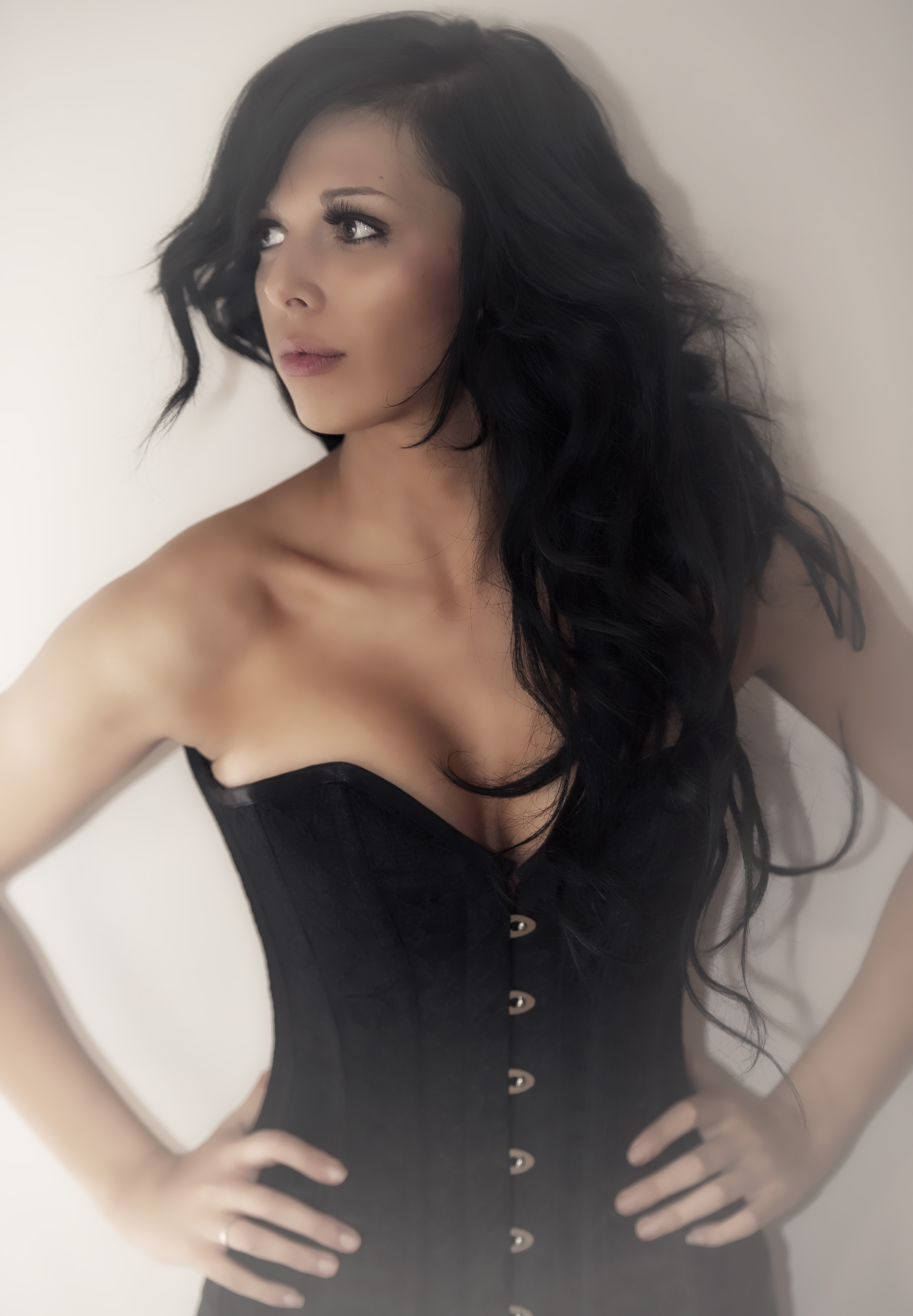
Modern corset

By the early 2000s, "sideboob" (also known as "side cleavage"), i.e. the exposure of the side of the breast had become popular. One writer called it the "new cleavage". In 2008, Armand Limnander wrote in The New York Times the "underboob" (also known as "bottom cleavage" and "reverse cleavage") was "a newly fetishized anatomical zone where the lower part of the breast meets the torso, popularized by 80s rock chicks in cutoff tank tops". It was further popularized by dancer-singer Teyana Taylor in the music video for Kanye West's 2016 song "Fade". Supermodels, including Bella Hadid, Gigi Hadid, and Kendall Jenner, contributed to the trend, which has appeared at beaches, on the red carpet, and in social media posts.

In the 2010s and early 2020s, cleavage-enhancing bras began to decline in popularity. Bralettes and soft bras gained market share at the expense of underwire and padded bras, sometimes also serving as outerwear. Some bralettes have plunging designs, light padding or bottom support. In November 2016, the UK version of fashion magazine Vogue said "Cleavage is over"; this statement was widely criticized. Soft bras and sideboobs became popular over prominent cleavages. Soft bras comprised 30% of online retailer Net-a-Porter's bra sales by 2016. In 2017, the sales of cleavage-boosting bras fell by 45% while at Marks & Spencer, sales of wire-free bras grew by 40%.

Jess Cartner-Morley, fashion editor of The Guardian, reported in 2018 many women were dressing without bras, producing a less-dramatic cleavage, which she called "quiet cleavage". According to Sarah Shotton, creative director of Agent Provocateur, "Now it's about the athletic body, health and wellbeing" rather than the male gaze. According to lingerie designer Araks Yeramyan, "It was #MeToo that catapulted the bralette movement into what it is today". During the COVID-19 lockdowns, CNBC reported a drop of 12% in bra sales across 100 retailers while YouTubers made tutorials on re-purposing bras as face masks; this trend was sometimes called a "lockdown liberation".

== Enhancement ==
Throughout history, women have used many methods, including accentuation and display of breasts within the context of cultural norms of fashion and modesty, to enhance their physical attractiveness and femininity. Fetishization of breasts results in significant anxiety in women about having the correct breasts and resulting cleavage. All kinds of exercises, brassières and other methods of bust improvement have been recommended and advertised to cater for this need.

=== Corsetry and bras ===
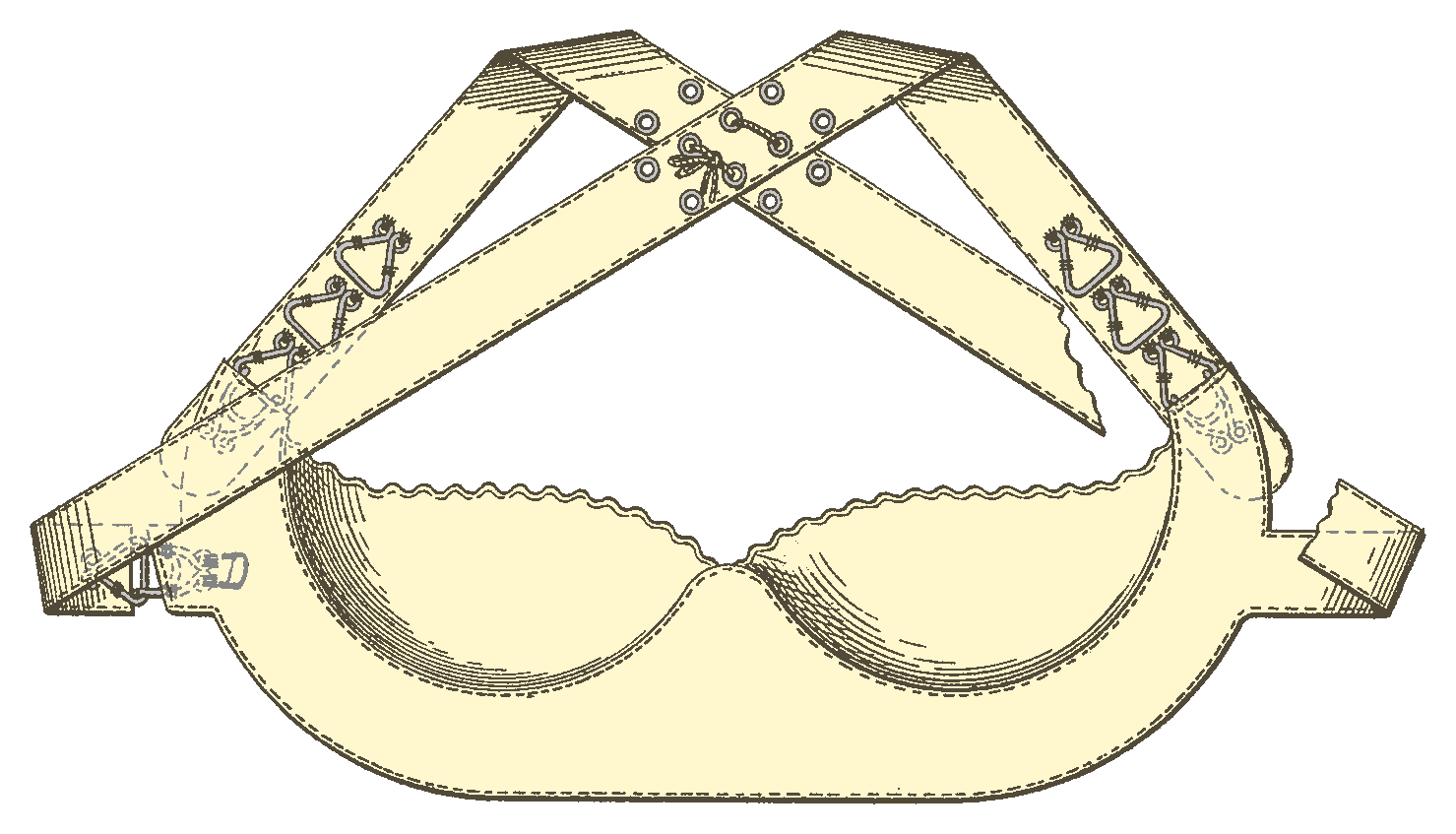
Marie Tucek's "breast supporter" (1893), made of metal or cardboard plates covered with silk or canvas, from original patent application

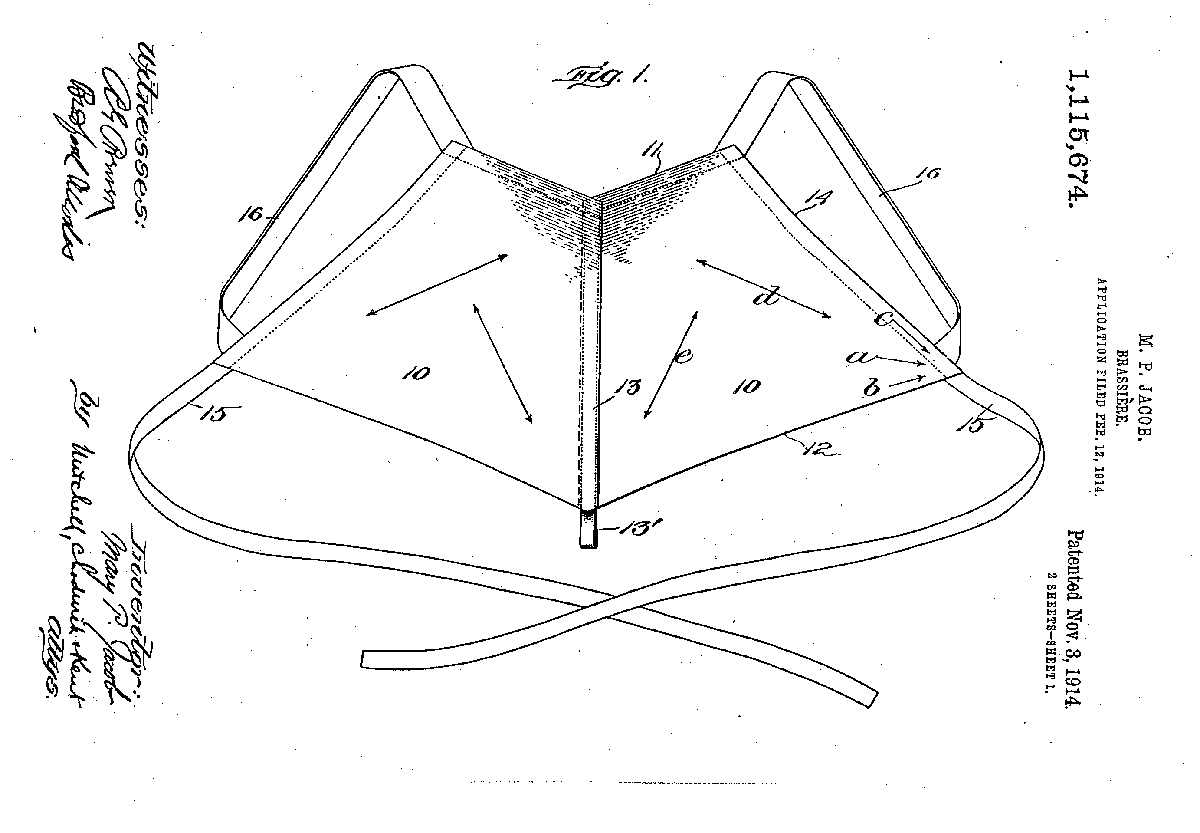
Mary Phelps Jacob's "backless brassiere" (1914), made of two handkerchiefs and some ribbon, from original patent application

Corsetry and bras are often used to enhance cleavage; author Nan McNab claims that "it has been said the quickest way for a woman to change her breasts is to buy a bra". Before the brassière became popular, the bust was encased in corsets and structured garments called "bust improvers", which were made of boning and lace.

When corsets became unfashionable, brassières and padding helped to project, display and emphasize the breasts. These were initially manufactured by small companies and supplied to retailers. Women had the choice of long-line bras, built-up backs, wedge-shaped inserts between the cups, wider straps, Lastex, firm bands under the cup, and light boning. In 2020, several lingerie and shapewear manufacturers, among them Wonderbra, Frederick's of Hollywood, Agent Provocateur and Victoria's Secret, produce bras that enhance cleavage and offer more than 30 types of bra, including underwire, padded, plunge and push-up bras.

Development of underwire bras started in the 1930s but they did not gain widespread popularity until the 1950s, when the end of World War II freed metal for domestic use. In an underwire bra, a thin strip of metal, plastic or resin—usually with a nylon coating at both ends—is sewn into the bra fabric and under each cup from the center gore to the armpit. The insert helps to lift, separate, shape and support the breasts. Underwire bras can rub and press against the breast, causing skin irritation and breast pain, and the wire of a worn bra can protrude from the fabric.

Padded bras have extra material, which may be foam, silicone, gel, air or fluid, in the cups to help the breasts look fuller. Different designs provide coverage and support, hide nipples, add shape to breasts that are far apart, and add comfort. Graduated padding has more padding at the bottom of the cups and gradually tapers towards the top.

Plunge bra covers the nipples and the lower part of the breasts while leaving the top part bare, making it suitable for low-cut tops and deep V-necks. Plunge bras also have a lower, shorter and narrower center gore that maintains support while increasing cleavage by allowing the gore to drop several inches below the middle of the breasts. Plunge bras may be padded or push the breasts together to create cleavage.

Push-up bras, which emerged in the mid-20th century, are designed to press the breasts upwards and closer together to give a fuller appearance with help of padded cups, differing from other padded bras in location of the pads. It leaves the upper and inner area of breasts uncovered adding more cleavage. Most of the push-up bras have underwires for added lift and support, while the padding is commonly made of foam. Wonderbra used to have 54 design elements in their push-up bras, including a three-part cup, underwires, a precision-angled back, rigid straps, and removable "cookies".

In some forms of exercise, breasts unsupported by a sports bra are exposed to greater risk of droopiness. Author Taffy Brodesser-Akner claims that long hours wearing a sports bra or a push-up bra that presses breasts together can cause cleavage wrinkles, as does spending long hours sleeping on the side, during which the top breast bend past the body's midline. The deep vertical creases of these wrinkles stay longer as the collagen in skin start to break down with age and exposure to sun. Women with bigger breasts, either natural or surgically enhanced, suffer more from cleavage wrinkles. There have been claims of bra designs that minimize cleavage wrinkles. Cleavage wrinkles can also be reduced with botox and, according to Samantha Wilson, founder of skincare product manufacturer Skin Republic, by intense pulsed light (IPM), collagen induction therapy (CIT) and high-intensity focused ultrasound. In 2009, Slovenian lingerie manufacturer Lisca introduced a high-tech "Smart Memory Bra" that was supposed to push breasts further when its wearer becomes sexually aroused.

=== Tape and inserts ===
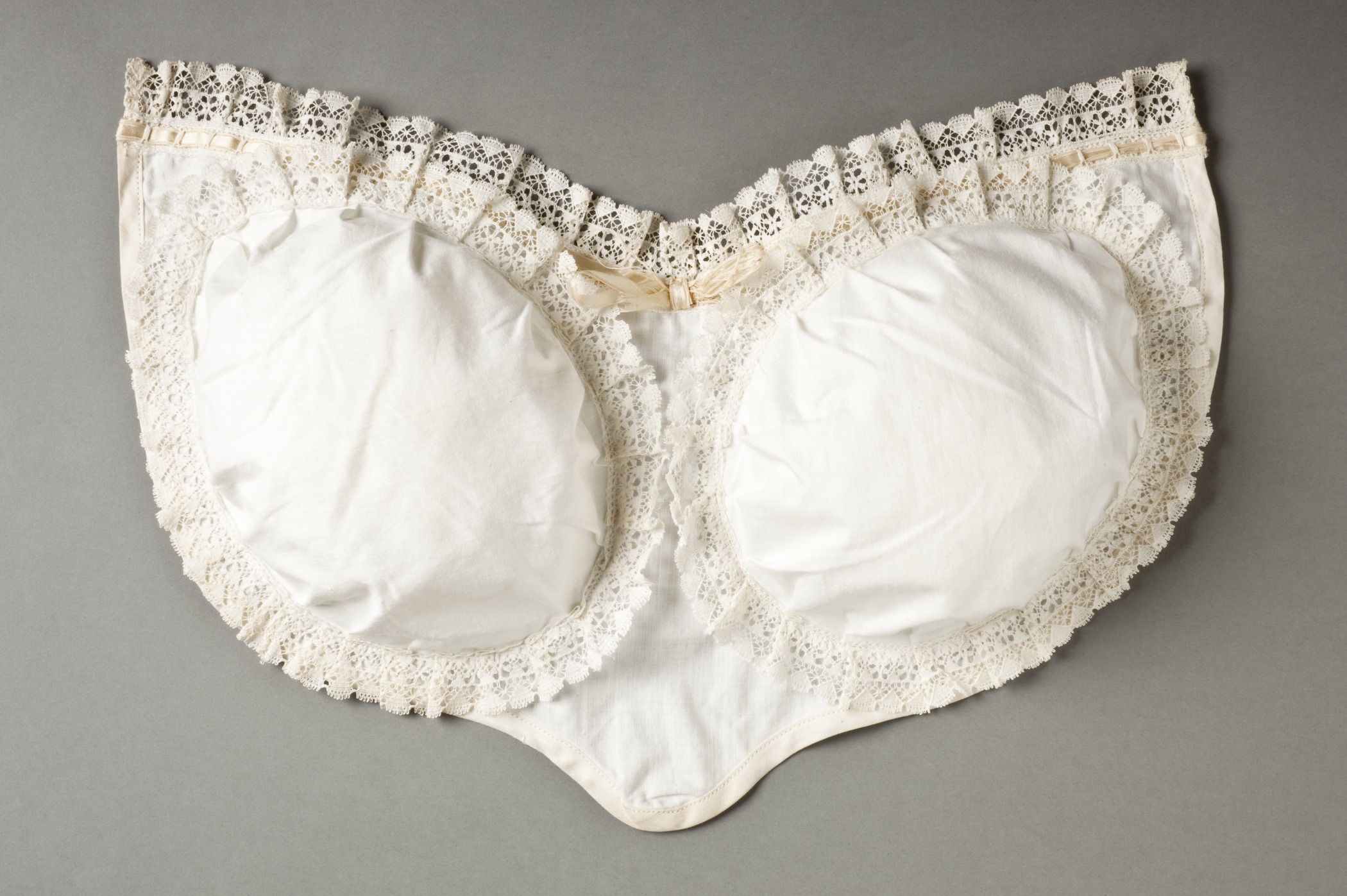
Cotton and silk bust improver, c. 1890

Accessories, including lingerie tapes or duct tapes, removable gel pads, fabrics, silicone or microfiber inserts, and clothing—including socks—are used to enhance cleavage. Many women, such as beauty pageant participants and transgender people, create cleavage by placing tape underneath and across their breasts, bending forward, tightly pulling them together and up. Types of tape used include lingerie tape, surgical tape and athletic tape. Some use a strip of moleskin under the breasts; this is held in place with tape. Use of the wrong techniques or tape with too strong an adhesive can cause injuries such as rashes, blisters and torn skin.

Falsies, small silicone-gel pads that are similar to the removable pads sold with some push-up bras, are sometimes referred to colloquially as "chicken fillets". Falsies evolved from the bosom pads of the 17th century that were often made of stiff rubber. By the mid-1800s, "bust improvers" were made using soft fabric pads of cotton and wool or inflatable rubber. In 1896, celluloid falsies were advertised and in the 20th century, soft foam rubber pads became available. Young women, some as young as 15, were expected to wear falsies to fill out their bodices. For cross-dressers or trans women who have not undergone hormone therapy or breast augmentation, semi-rigid pieces of material such as plastic is sometimes applied to the skin using surgical tape, surgical adhesive, specialist adhesives or even general-purpose craft glue to get a feminine cleavage.

=== Surgery ===
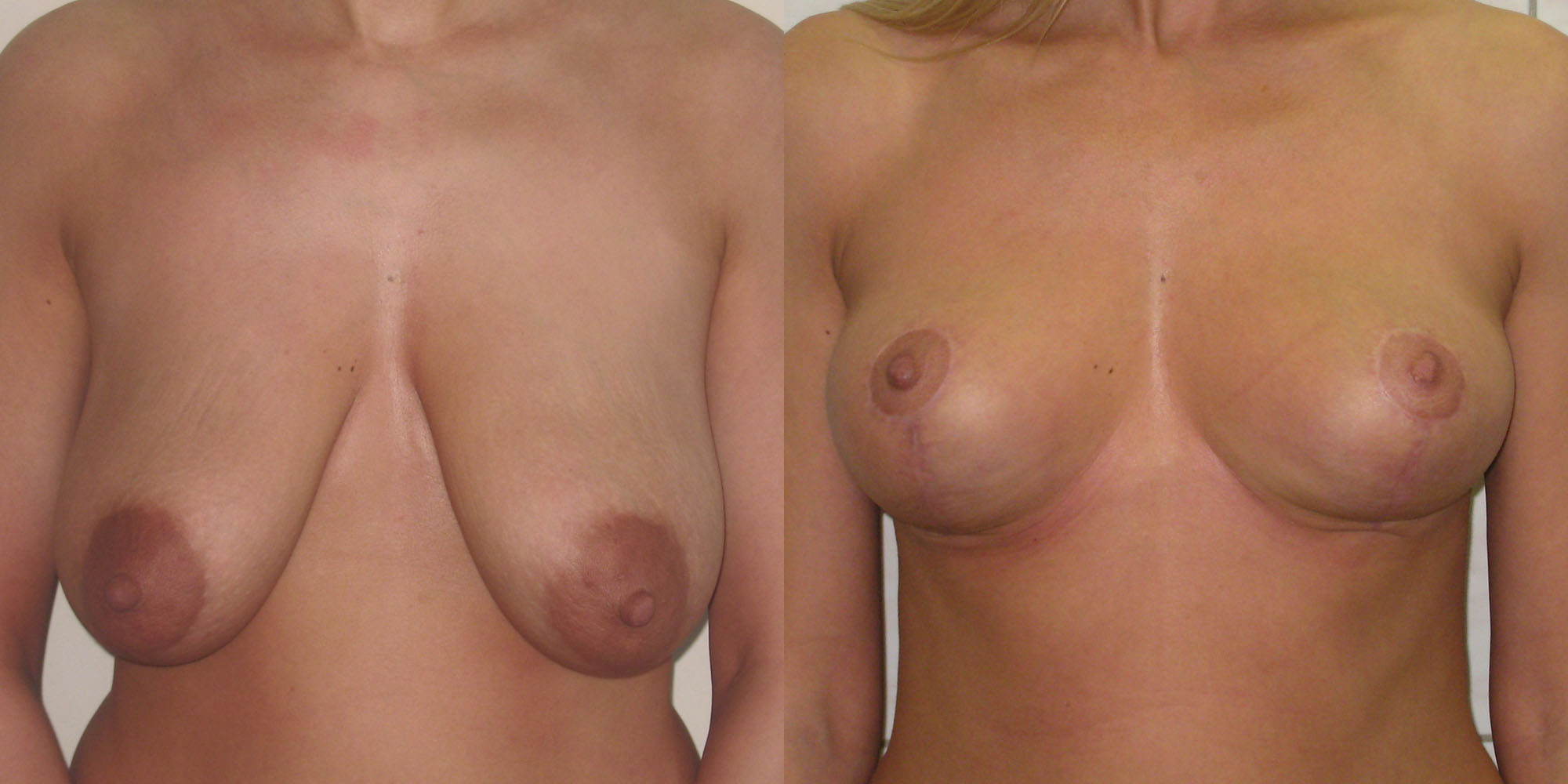
Breasts before and after mammaplasty, with scars visible

Cleavage, from a surgical perspective, is a combination of the intermammary distance and the degree of "fill" in the medial portion of the breast. Some flat-chested women feel self-conscious about their small breasts and want to improve their sexual attractiveness by seeking breast augmentation. According to plastic surgeon Gerard H. Pitman, "you can't have cleavage with an A cup. You have to be at least a B or a C." It is easier to push big breasts together to accent the hollow between them. Implants filled with sterile saline solution and implants filled with viscous silicone gel are used for breast reconstruction, and for the augmentation and enhancement of aesthetics—size, shape, and texture—of breasts. Plastic surgeons changed from using bodily tissues to these newer technologies in the 1950s.

Sometimes, fat is injected into the subcutaneous plane to narrow the gap of the cleavage and is grafted onto wide-chested individuals. During breast reconstruction, surgeons are normally careful to preserve the natural cleavage of the breasts. Attempts to create or increase cleavage by loosening the medial borders of the breasts could result in symmastia (also called a "uniboob"), a confluence of the breast tissue of both breasts across the midline in front of the sternum, creating a lack of defined cleavage. About 3 cm of cleavage distance is recommended while augmenting breasts, to avoid medial perforation, compromised soft tissues, visible implants, rippling and symmastia. A high surgical release of pectoralis major muscles can enhance cleavage at the risk of the implant showing through soft tissues.

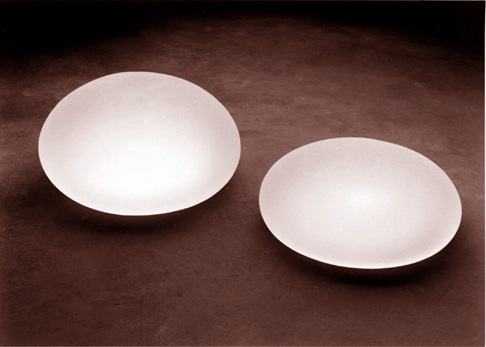
Saline-filled breast implants

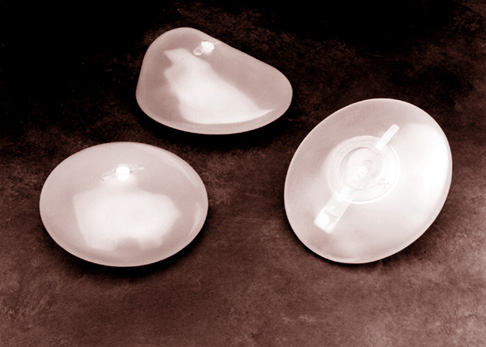
Silicone gel-filled breast implants

A 2016 paper reported breast augmentation was one of the most common aesthetic surgery procedures performed by plastic surgeons. Annually, an estimated 8,000–20,000 surgeries are done in the UK and over 300,000 in the U.S. According to the paper, in the U.S., 4% of women had breast implants at the time. It reported annual sales of 300,000 implants in South America and estimated the global number of women with breast implants to be between five and ten million.

Women seeking breast augmentation often request a specific form of cleavage enhancement and often produce photographs of desired cleavage shapes and appearances. Many of those who seek breast augmentation want "full cleavage" which, according to plastic surgeon Jeffrey Weinzweig, "in reality results only from external forces, such as a brassier. Attempts to create such full cleavage require unacceptable compromise to other aesthetic factors of the breast."

The width of cleavage is determined at the point at which the breast tissue attaches to the periosteal bone membrane that covers the sternum and by the medial attachments of the pectoralis major (chest muscle). By modern cultural values, cleavage is considered more attractive when breasts are close together. A narrow cleft between the breasts is identified as unusual anatomy. Plastic surgeon John B. Tebbetts finds creating a narrow intermammary distance is not a priority over other aspects. He says if a patient wishes a gluteal appearance for her cleavage, she should use "an appropriate push up brassiere", avoiding "the temptation to create it surgically". Because large breasts are not always closer together than smaller ones, and because implants change only the volume of the breasts, not their position, implants cannot produce a tight cleavage if the gap between the breasts is wide. Wide-set breasts will have a wide cleavage even after surgery because implants cannot correct the condition. It is difficult to produce sufficiently feminine cleavage for trans women, even with breast augmentation surgery, because people assigned male at birth have nipple-areolar complexes set farther apart on their chests than those assigned female at birth do. Fat grafting may be used to reduce the width of cleavage in trans women.

=== Exercise and supplements ===
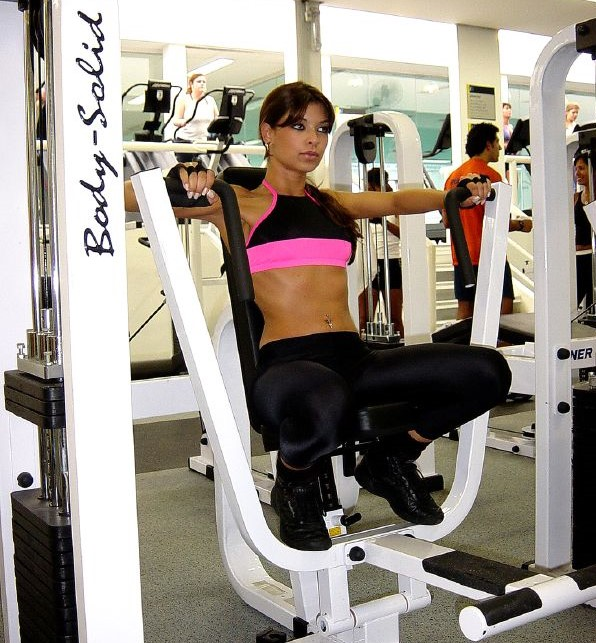
Exercise on a machine fly, a recommended way to develop cleavage

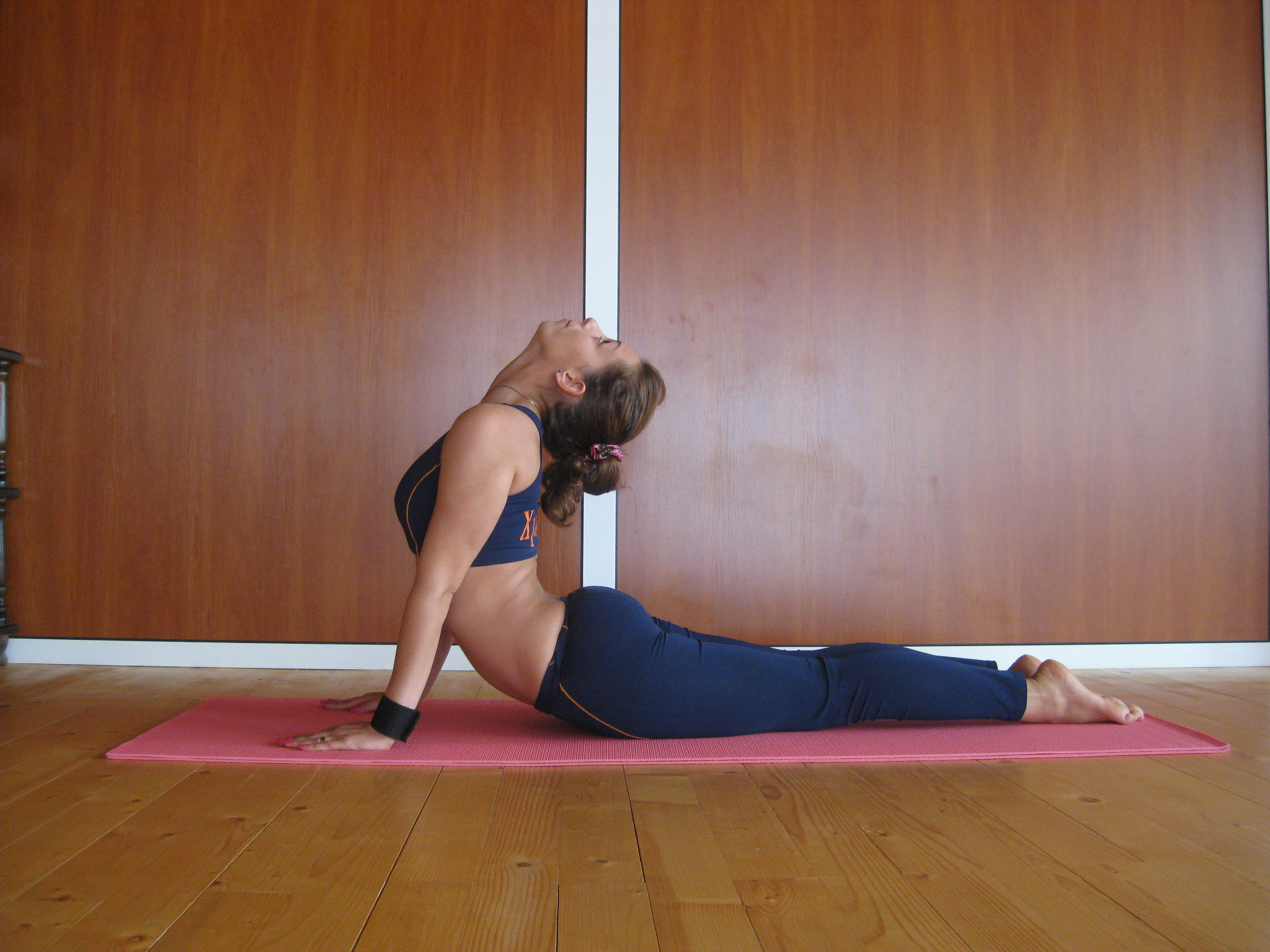
Bhujangasana (cobra pose) is one of the most recommended yoga poses for cleavage improvement

Regular exercise of the muscles and fibers of the pectoral complex, which lies just under the fatty tissues of the breast, helps prevent droopiness, creates the illusion of larger and firmer breasts, and enhances cleavage. Exercise does not enlarge the breasts but developing the pectoral muscles on the chest can give them a fuller appearance. Training the chest does not change the structure of the breasts because breast tissue is fat, which cannot be shaped; chest training can, however, prevent breasts from drooping and sagging by firming the muscles that surround the sternum. Even in moderately athletic women, the pectoralis major muscles on either side of the cleavage become more prominent with exercise.

The most effective exercises for developing breasts and improving cleavage are incline chest press, chest fly and chest dip. Weight training, nautilus machines, push-ups and chest presses are helpful, as are exercise balls, dumbbells, rowing and basketball. Flat chest dumbbell pullovers and dumbbell flyers on incline bench is recommended for beginners, while the advanced exercisers may include bench press movements, flyers, pullovers, Pec Decs and push-ups at least twice a week.

Pilates, tai chi and yoga boost cleavage by improving posture and strengthening the chest muscles. Hunching, tightening and closing off of the chest in yoga asanas are particularly helpful, along with breathing exercises like deep breathing (sama vritti or kapalabhati) and retention (kumbhaka). The most recommended asanas to develop cleavage are backbends like cobra, bow, camel, bridge and locust; twisted poses like cow face and lord of the fishes; front bends like plough and resting child; standing poses like tree and warrior; and leg stretches like raised leg and inverted leg stretch.

Supplements are frequently portrayed as natural means to increase breast size with the suggestion they are free from risk. Commonly used ingredients include black cohosh, (shown to have no estrogenic effect) dong quai, hops, kava (may cause liver damage) and zearalenone (increases probability of estrogen-dependent breast cancer and may reduce fertility) among others. Despite folklore about using herbs for breast enlargement, there is no scientific evidence to support the effectiveness of any breast enlargement supplement. In the United States, both the Federal Trade Commission and the Food and Drug Administration have taken action against the manufacturers of these products for fraudulent practices.

=== Grooming and makeup ===
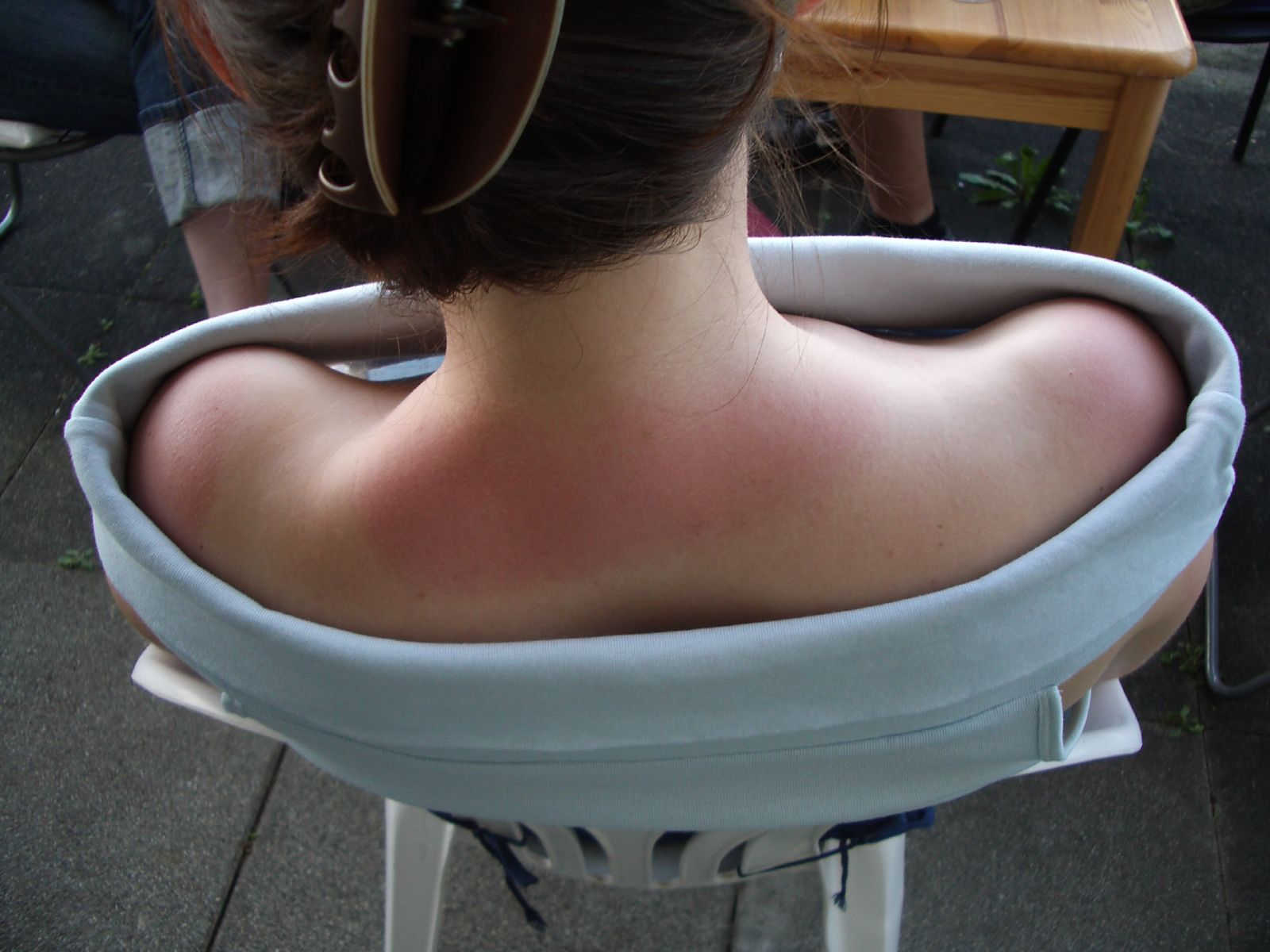
Sunburnt upper décolletage (neck and shoulder)

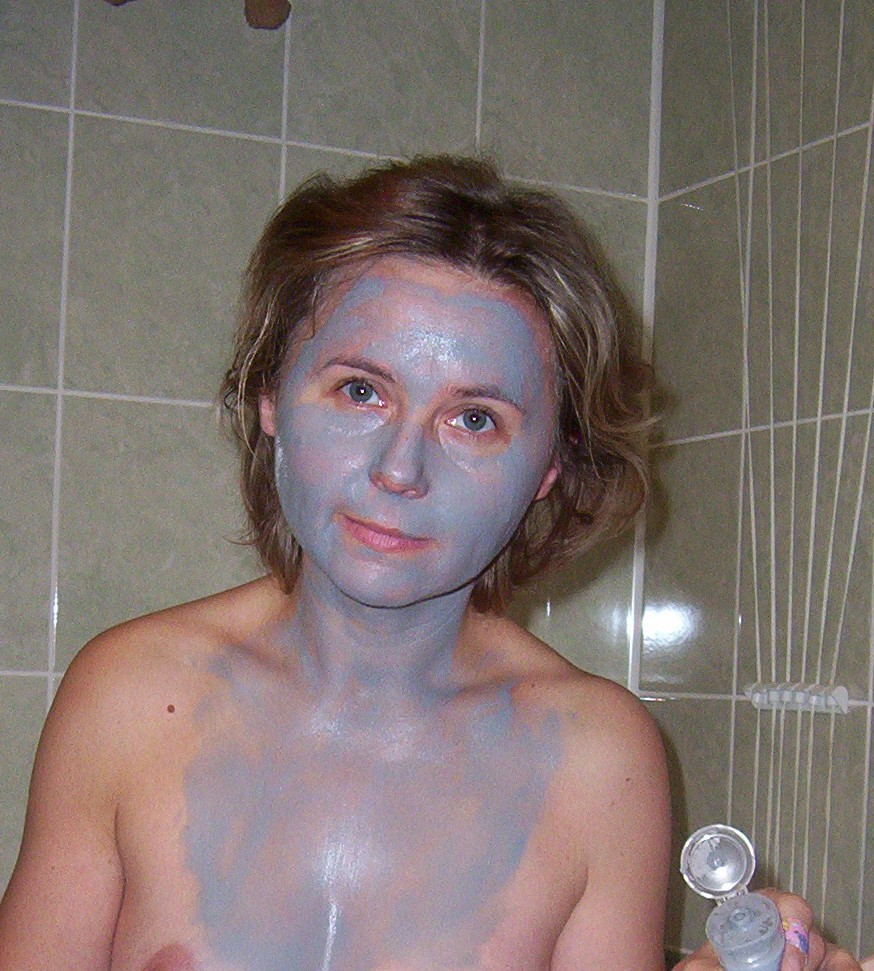
Using facial mask in cleavage area

According to Samantha Wilson of Skin Republic, dermatologist Paul Jarrod Frank, and Philippa Curnow of Elizabeth Arden, compared with the epidermis on the face, the epidermis on the cleavage and neck has fewer hair follicles and oil glands, little subcutaneous fat cushioning the area, a limited number melanocytes, and is much thinner and more fragile. Skin in these areas can suffer from damage resulting in cleavage wrinkles, uneven skin tone, age spots, scars from heat rash, and female chest hairs, and may show loss of elasticity sooner. Some perfumes and colognes can cause a phototoxic rashes on the neck, wrists and cleavage that leaves patterned hyperpigmentation when healed.

According to Curnow, the skin of the cleavage area often ages more quickly because it experiences more exposure to ultraviolet radiation (UV) and environmental factors like pollution than skin that remains covered in many cultures, while moisturizers and sunscreens are used more on the face and neck. According to Marnina Diprose, founder of skin care clinic Aroze Dermal Therapies, ultraviolet radiation can break down collagen and cause pigment deposition, leading to mottled pigmentation on the cleavage. The skin of the cleavage area may also show loss of elasticity more quickly. Dermatoheliosis (photo aging) is a problem when cleavage skin is exposed for prolonged periods to UV radiation in sunlight; it is characterized by hyperpigmentation, leathery texture, roughness, wrinkles, lentigines (age spots), actinic elastosis and telangiectasias (spider veins). For protection, regular use of high-factor sunscreen on the cleavage area is recommended by reconstructive surgeon Anh Nguyen and others.

Products routinely used on the face, including vitamin A, vitamin B3, and vitamin C, masks, cleansers, moisturizers, and exfoliators, are also applied to the cleavage, though products specifically designed for the cleavage and neck and also available. Additionally body oils like shea butter, coconut oil and almond oil, and bronzers are also used to achieve a "glowing" cleavage. Splashing cold water on the cleavage also helps.

According to Victoria's Secret model Taylor Hill, most professional models use makeup to better define their cleavage. Makeup artist Stephen Dimmick recommends using a luminizer on the clavicle area. Makeup with shading effects is used to make cleavage appear deeper and the breasts look fuller. The middle of the cleavage is made to look deeper by using a shade of makeup color that is darker than the base color of the skin, while the most prominent areas of the breasts are made to look larger or more protruding by the use of a paler color. An illuminator on the collar bones and bronzing below them is used for more accent. Beauty journalist Zoe Weiner describes a more elaborate process of outlining the breasts with a contouring stick that is slightly darker than the skin tone then highlighting inside the contour lines with a highlighter slightly lighter than skin tone, followed by blending with a contouring brush in circular motions.

=== Embellishments ===
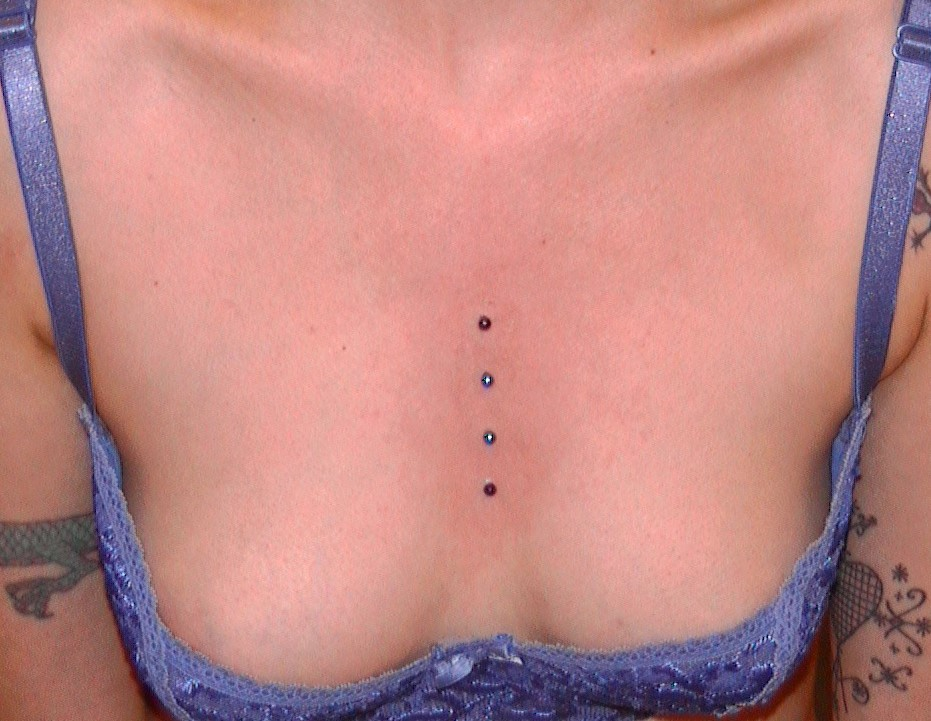
Cleavage piercing

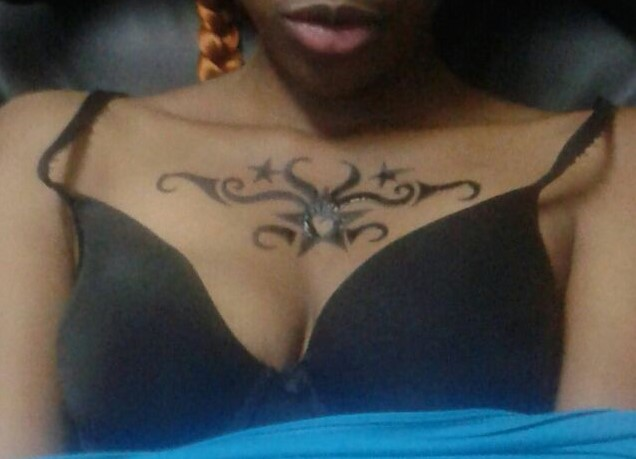
Cleavage tattoo

Bright colors, ornaments and accessories, including ruffles and glitters that add detail to the cleavage area, help to make breasts look bigger and draw attention to them. Using the cleavage as a canvas, a recommended way of adornment is to layer necklaces and chokers with a pendant as a centerpiece of the cleavage. Georgian era-style rivière necklaces are also popular items with which to dress the décolletage.

According to celebrity tattoo artist and tattoo historian Lyle Tuttle, sternum tattoos became popular with women's liberation. Singer Rihanna was a major driver in popularizing cleavage tattoos. According to tattooist Mira Mariah, "Since most sternums are a flat plane, there are really good opportunities for detail". Underboob tattoos are generally done under the breasts but could wrap around the sternum, cleavage, side boob and ribs.

Cleavage piercings, also known as chest piercings and sternum piercings—one of the most-admired body piercings—is done on the cleavage area vertically or horizontally. A sternum piercing can be located anywhere along the sternum and can be either a surface piercing or a dermal piercing. The jewelry, generally flexible rods made of hypoallergenic metal like surgical titanium, surgical stainless steel, niobium or gold (14 karat and above), is placed vertically or horizontally between the breasts.

== Male cleavage ==
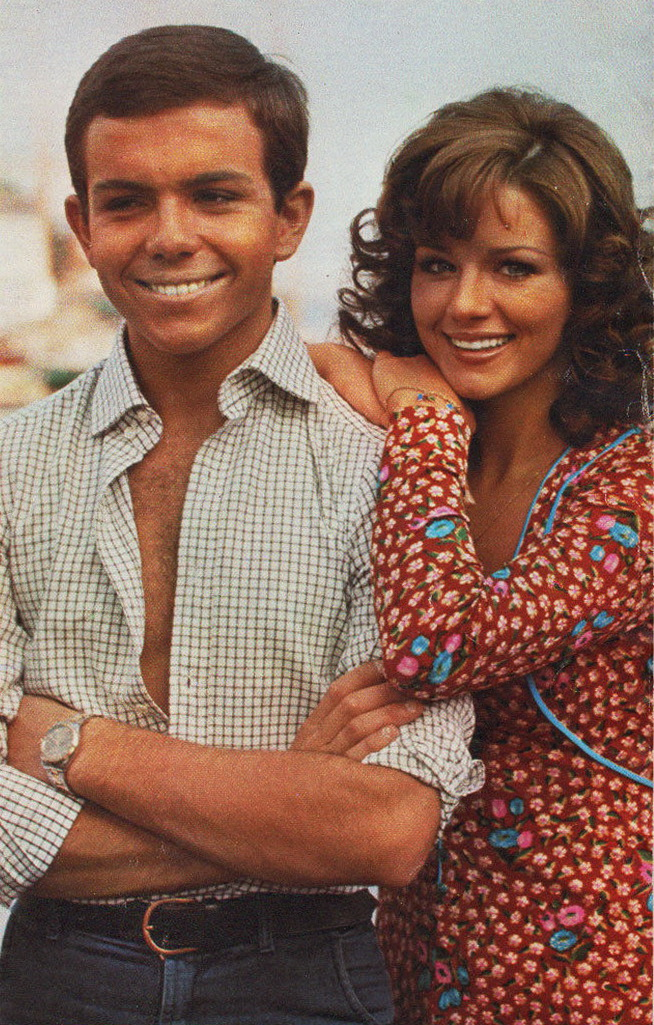
Italy 1974

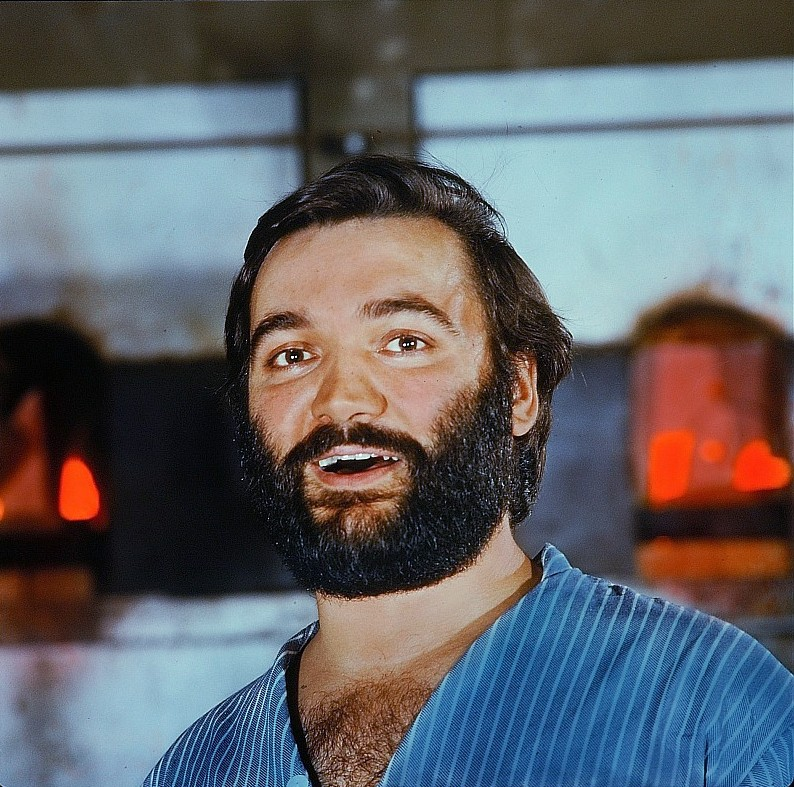
Germany 1980

In the 1970s, daring women and men of all ages left top buttons on shirts and blouses open to display pectoral muscles, cleavage and a firm body in a "groovy" style.

Male cleavage (also known as "heavage"), a result of low necklines or unbuttoned shirts, has been a movie trend since the 1920s. Douglas Fairbanks revealed his chest in films including The Thief of Bagdad (1924) and The Iron Mask (1929), and Errol Flynn showed his male cleavage in movies like The Adventures of Robin Hood (1938). This aesthetic continued into the 1950s and 1960s with movie stars like Marlon Brando, who also displayed his chest in The Adventures of Robin Hood, and Sean Connery in many James Bond movies; but it went out of fashion after the 1970s, which according to fashion historian Robert Bryan was "the golden age of male chest hair", epitomized by John Travolta in Saturday Night Fever (1977).

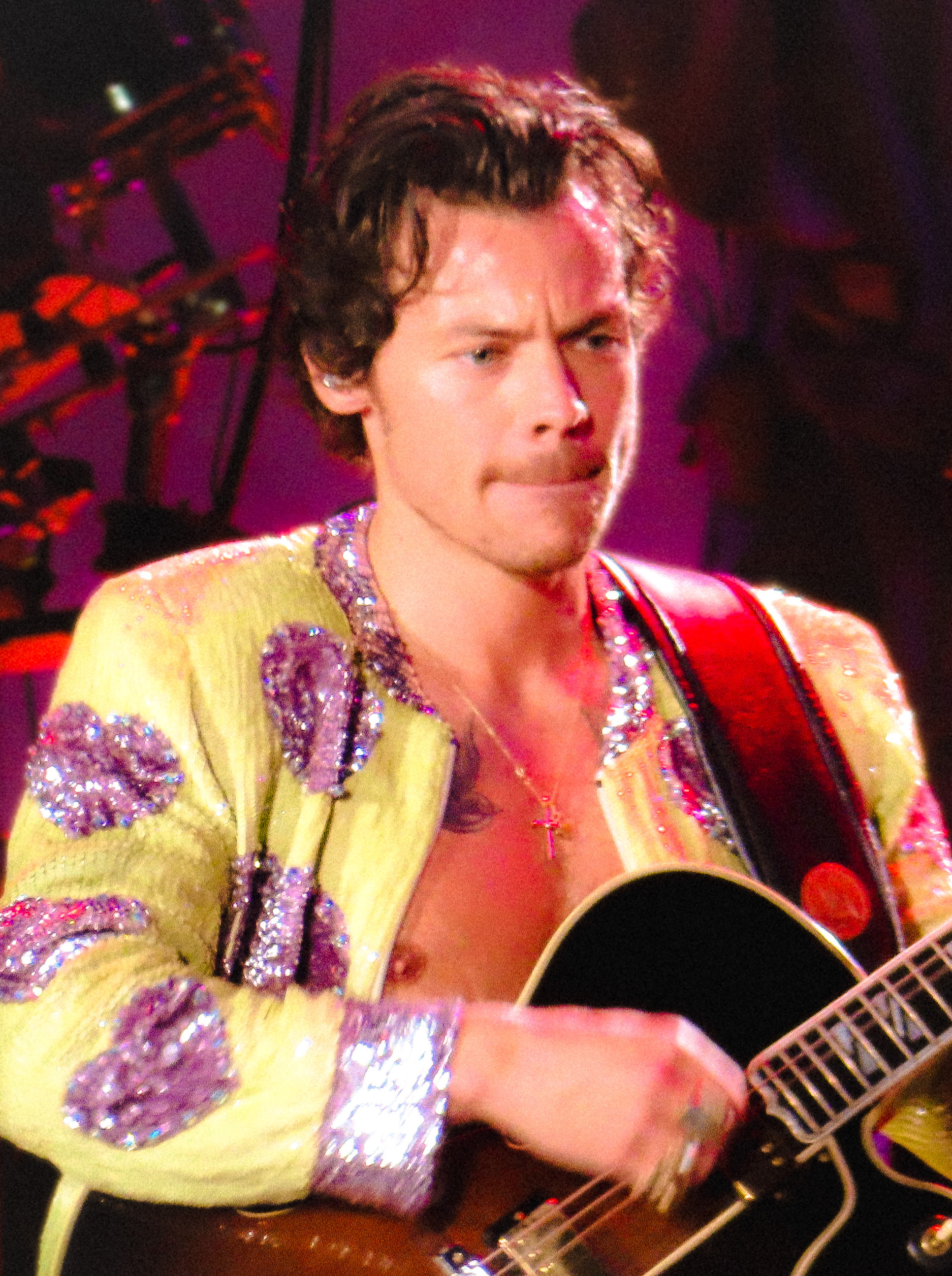
Musician Harry Styles wearing a jacket that displays his cleavage at a 2022 Love on Tour concert in Rio de Janeiro

This look was also popular with celebrities like Mick Jagger and Burt Reynolds in the 1970s, and Harry Styles, Jude Law, Simon Cowell and Kanye West in the 2010s. Throughout the 1970s, more men unbuttoned their shirts as both men and women took an anti-fashion approach to clothing and the rise of the leisure wear, and adopted comfortable, unisex styles. As a new masculine style evolved, gay men adopted a traditionally masculine or working-class style with "half-unbuttoned shirt above the sweaty chest" and tight jeans, rejecting the idea that gay men want to be women.

In India, male cleavage became popular with Bollywood movie stars Salman Khan (who was named "the king of cleavage" by The Economic Times), Shekhar Suman in the 1990s, and Shahid Kapoor and Akshay Kumar in the 2000s. Many male K-pop stars are also known for their cleavage. Man cleavage came back into style in the 2010s, especially among hipsters and Hispanic and Latino Americans. Stylist Christiaan Choy attributes its resurgence to fit physiques and the urge for personal styles. Fashion entrepreneur Harvey Paulvin said a men's V-neck should be "two to four inches from the collar". Some men groom their chest hair to improve the male cleavage look (sometimes known as "manscaping"). Many still considered the look inappropriate for most situations.

== See also ==
- Backless dress – Type of dress
- Clothing laws by country
- Toplessness – Having a woman's torso exposed above the waist
- Toe cleavage – Partial exposure of toes in footwear
- Buttock cleavage – Minor exposure of the buttocks
- Pai slash – Breasts bisected by a diagonal strap
