= Pai slash =

Breasts bisected by a diagonal strap

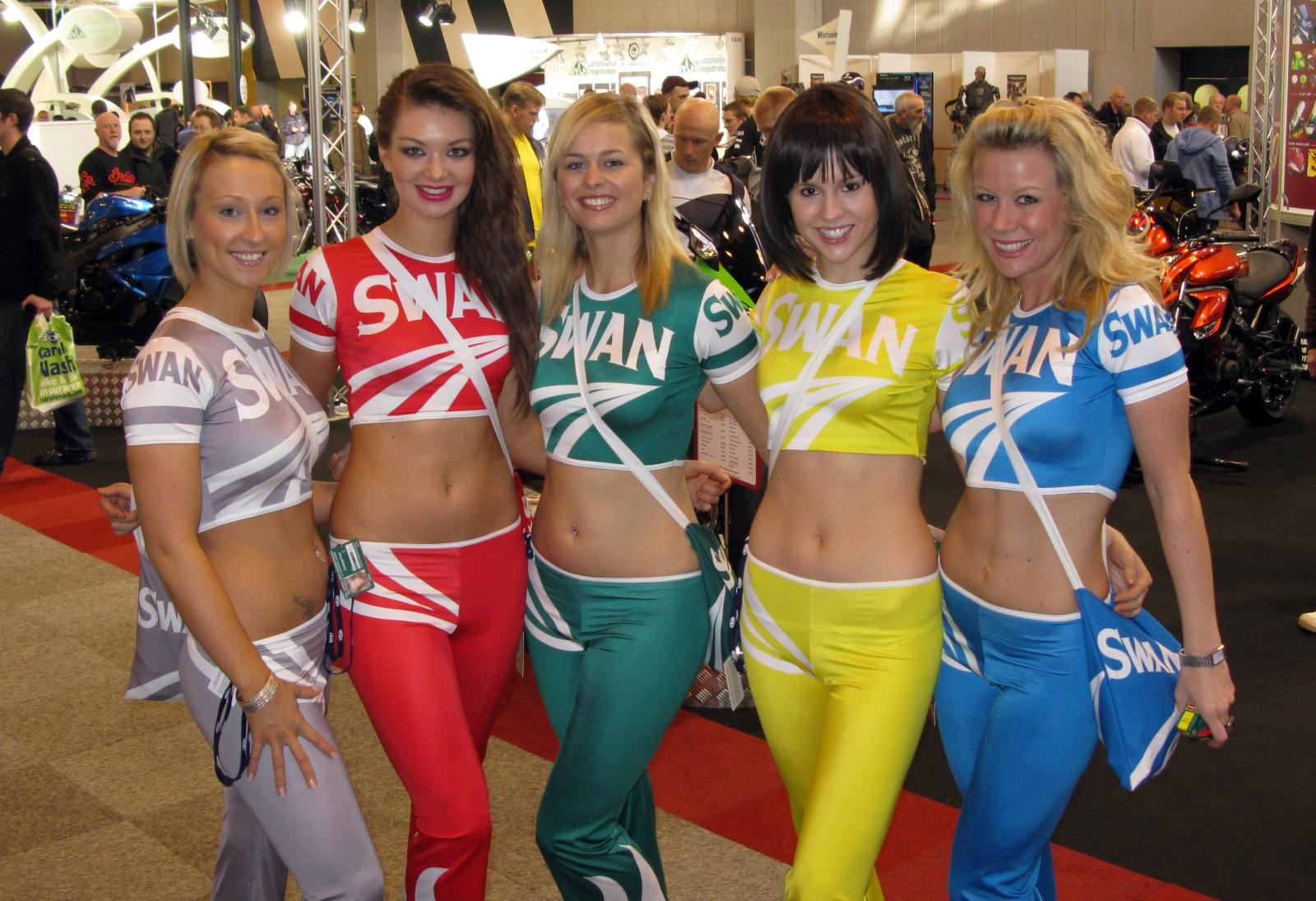
The sashes in this uniform have a 'pai slash' effect.

In Japanese culture, π/ (パイスラッシュ or パイスラ, Romanized Paisurasshu, pai sura, paisura or pai slash) denotes the appearance of a woman's breasts bisected by a diagonal strap (slash), such as an automobile shoulder harness or purse worn cross-body. The term involves a play on words of the Japanese word for breasts, oppai. The term began to appear on the Internet in June 2006.

There is a similar term in Hong Kong called 𠝹波袋 (or 鎅波袋, lit. 'cutting the breasts').

== See also ==
- Cleavage (breasts)
