= Alexandre Guillaume Mouslier de Moissy =

French writer and dramaturge

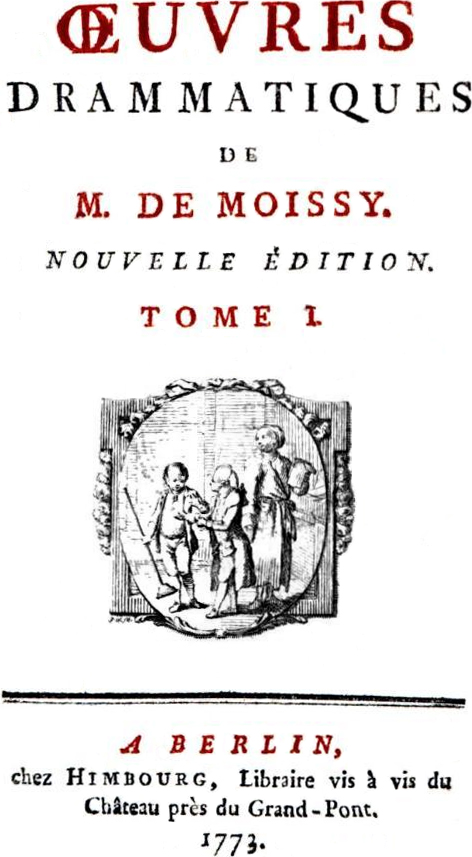
Works of de Moissy

Alexandre Guillaume Mouslier de Moissy (1712 – 8 November 1777) was a French writer and dramaturge. He was born and died in Paris.

== Biography ==
He was a royal guard when, at the age of 38, he was advised to assume a literary career. Encouraged by the success of his first work, he produced others.

== Works ==
Theater

- Le Bienfait anonyme, ou le Faux Généreux, comedy, Paris, Hôtel de Bourgogne, 10 December 1744
- Le Provincial à Paris ou le Pouvoir de l'amour et de la raison, comedy, Théâtre italien de Paris, 4 May 1750
- Les Fausses Inconstances, comedy, Théâtre italien de Paris, 22 September 1750
- Le Valet maître, comedy, Paris, Théâtre de la rue des Fossés Saint-Germain, 6 October 1751
- La Nouvelle École des femmes, comedy, Théâtre italien de Paris, 6 April 1758
- L'Ennuyé, ou l'Embarras du choix, comedy, Paris, Hôtel de Bourgogne, 1 March 1759
- L'Impromptu de l'amour, comedy, Théâtre italien de Paris, 19 November 1759
- La Nouvelle École des maris, comedy, Paris, Hôtel de Bourgogne, 6 April 1758
- Bélisaire, epic comedy, 1759
- Les Deux Frères, ou la Prévention vaincue, comedy, Paris, Théâtre de la rue des Fossés Saint-Germain, 27 July 1768 pdf
- Œuvres de théatre, 1768
- Le Vertueux mourant, drama, 1770
- La Vraie Mère, drama didactic-comedy, 1771

Proverbes dramatic

- Les Jeux de la petite Thalie, ou nouveaux petits drames dialogués sur des proverbes, propres à former les mœurs des enfants et des jeunes personnes, depuis l'âge de cinq ans jusqu'à vingt, 1764
- École dramatique de l'homme, suite des Jeux de la petite Thalie, âge viril, depuis 20 ans jusqu'à 50, 1770

Varia

- Lettres galantes et morales du marquis de *** au comte de ****, 1757
- Vérités philosophiques, tirées des Nuits d'Young, et mises en vers libres sous differents titres relatifs aux sujets qui sont traités dans chaque article, 1770
- Petit Recueil de physique et de morale, à l'usage des dames, contenant : Le nouveau présent de noce; Le pour et le contre de la vie humaine, 1771
- Essai sur l'éducation, poème, 1773 pdf
- La Nature philosophe, ou Dictionnaire de comparaisons et similitudes, agréables et instructives, adaptées aux sujets et aux mots de la langue française qui en sont susceptibles, enrichi d'un supplément de questions à résoudre, 1776

== Source biography ==
- Ferdinand Hoefer, Nouvelle Biographie générale, t. 35, Paris, Firmin-Didot, 1853, p. 778–9
