= Lisca (company) =

Slovenian lingerie company

Lisca (pronounced [ˈliːstsa]) is a Slovenian lingerie company. It was the largest such company in former Yugoslavia. Currently, it is one of the largest in Europe.
