= Ted Lockwood =

American plastic surgeon

Ted Lockwood (May 19, 1945 – May 14, 2005) was an aesthetic plastic surgeon in private practice and clinical assistant professor of plastic surgery at the University of Kansas Medical School, Kansas City, Kansas.

Lockwood developed an abdominoplasty procedure, the lower body lift, that combined the sculpting tool of liposuction with a lifting operation that shifted tissues "back where they came from".

Lockwood was born to Esther and Leo Lockwood. He grew up in the Kansas City area and received his medical degree at the University of Kansas School of Medicine. He completed his general surgical residency at Parkland Memorial Hospital in Dallas, Texas, and his plastic surgery residency at the Hospital of the University of Pennsylvania.

Lockwood received the American Society of Plastic Surgeons/Plastic Surgery Educational Foundation's Presidents Award. In 2005, he was presented with an award, developed in his name, in cooperation with Ethicon, recognizing the highest achievement in body contouring surgery. The Lockwood Award for Excellence in Body Contouring remains the most prestigious award given by the American Society for Aesthetic Plastic Surgery to surgeons that have made major contributions to the field of body contouring.

In 2005, Lockwood died at the age of 59 after a year-long struggle with brain cancer.
