= Jeffrey Klein =

Jeffrey Klein may refer to:

- Jeffrey D. Klein (born 1960), New York State Senator
- Jeffrey A. Klein, American dermatologist
- Jeffrey Bruce Klein (1948–2025), investigative journalist who co-founded Mother Jones magazine
- Jeff Klein (born 1976), American singer-songwriter
