= Lipotuck =

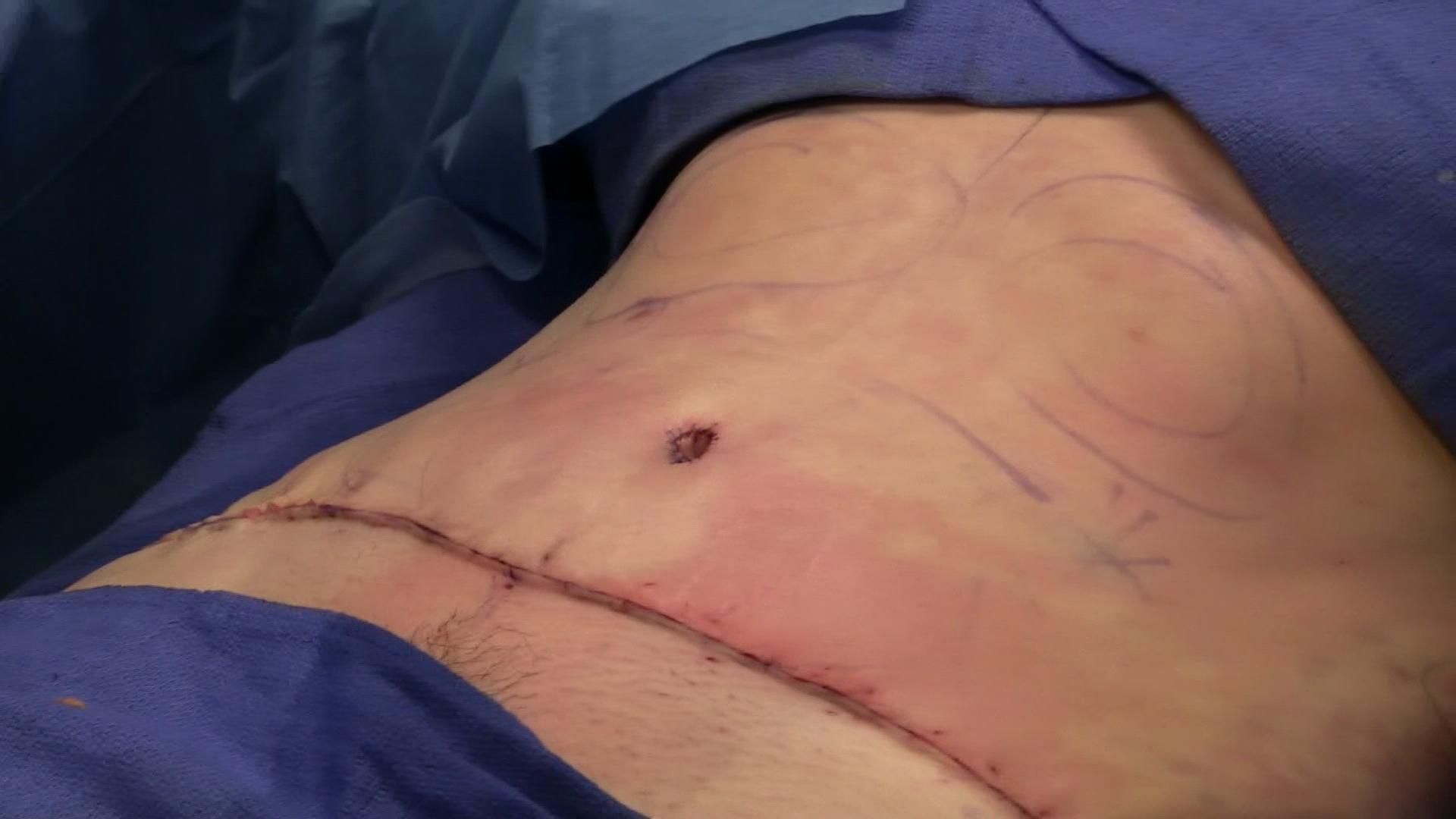
- The completely sutured area where nearly 100 square centimeters of skin was removed during a Lipotuck. Note the "neo"-umbilicus (belly button) that was reattached to a newly created hole.
- Specialty: Plastic surgery

Lipotuck is a procedure trademarked in 2006, by Dr. A. H. Ahmadi. The procedure is a single cosmetic surgery combining abdominoplasty (a.k.a. a "tummy tuck") and liposuction.

== Procedure ==
Some abdominoplastic procedures, while removing flesh from the abdomen, do nothing to correct for shaping around hips, thighs, and "love handles." Alternatively, the desired look can be achieved through multiple procedures: tummy tuck first, liposuction after. Lipotuck adds to a more traditional "tummy tuck" procedure with significant liposuction to the abdomen, hips, and thighs. This procedure is engineered to create flattering curves according to traditional notions of female beauty. Lipotuck also includes a repositioning of the patient's belly button, as the excess skin removed generally includes the original one.

One plastic surgeon in Australia describes Lipotuck as a procedure that "tends to be safer" because it uses tumescent liposuction, a procedures that "numbs and softens the fat," which "avoid[s] bleeding." Lipotuck is also more routine, and can be done as an outpatient procedure. Lipotucks can have the risk of seroma, which happens when some fluid collects in the surgical area that requires a small incision to drain afterwards.

The American Society of Plastic Surgeons does not currently recognize the term "Lipotuck" as an FDA-approved brand name for specific plastic surgery treatments. However, the term was successfully trademarked in 2006 by A. H. Ahmadi, a cosmetic surgeon in Sugar Land, Texas.

== Current Usage ==
The Lipotuck procedure is commonly used by plastic surgeons around the world; many procedures now use a combination of abdominoplasty, liposuction, and buttock contouring. Practitioners have also begun to offer "mommy makeovers," which generally include a combination of liposuction and abdominoplasty among other enhancements, most commonly breast augmentation. These have been called the "mommy makeover trifecta."

== See also ==
- Abdominoplasty
- Liposuction
- Plastic surgery
