= Josephus Tan =

Singaporean lawyer

- 陈俊良
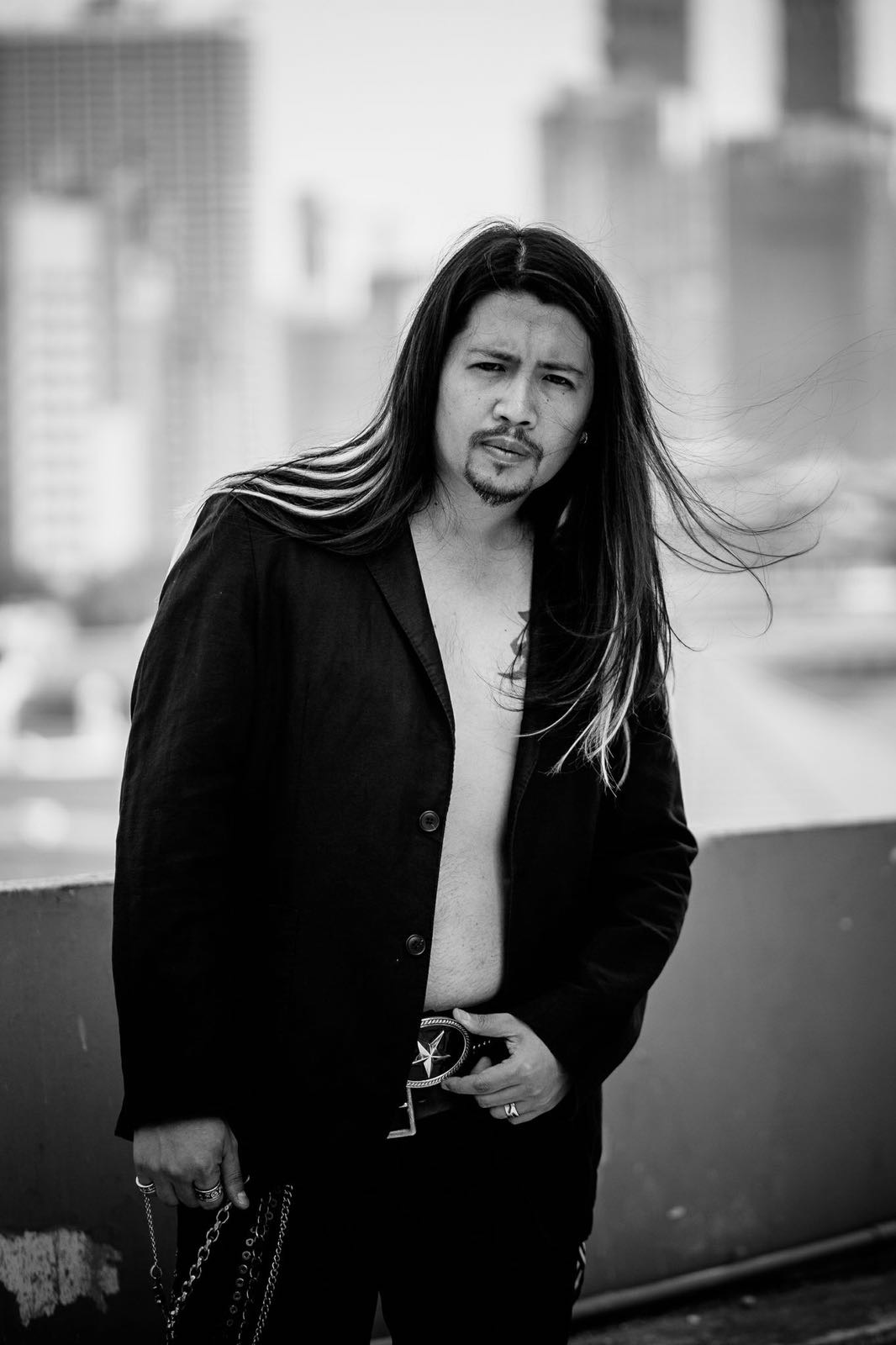
- Born: Tan Joon Liang; 15 October 1979 (age 47); Singapore
- Education: University of Southampton
- Occupation: Lawyer

Josephus Tan
- Simplified Chinese: 陈俊良
Transcriptions
Standard Mandarin
- Hanyu Pinyin: Chén Jùnliáng

Josephus Tan Joon Liang (born 15 October 1979) is a Singaporean criminal defence lawyer. In 2015, Tan received the Singapore Youth Award.

== Personal life ==
Born to parents who were blue-collar workers, Tan, the second of three sons, lived in a three-room HDB flat in Telok Blangah. Tan became a gangster in his teens whose bad drinking habits often led to fights and sleeping on the streets. Besides skipping school and getting into fights, he did badly in his GCE Ordinary Level and even failed to complete his GCE Advanced Level. He later found a job as a computer salesman.

He quit alcohol and took up an external diploma in law from the University of London at a private institution. With the diploma, he gained entry and went on to pass the bar exams at the University of Southampton.

In 2013, Tan's father died of multiple cancers. Shortly after his father's death, Tan had a pair of tattoos on his arms in honour of his father.

== Career ==
In July 2015, Tan received the Singapore Youth Award from the National Youth Council. By 2015, he had done over 5,000 hours of pro bono work. By 2017, the percentage of pro-bono work he has done increased from 30 per cent, when he first started, to 70 per cent.

In a 2018 interview with Channel NewsAsia, Tan revealed that besides ground concerns about his public image, there were also concerns about his "mannerisms, how I'm very straight with my words, even my financial status or my past records, my admission to the fact that I was prone to criminality, maybe during National Service as well." Despite his anger and disappointment then, he is still hopeful of his political future. He is working to resolve his financial woes which started when he incurred huge debt in an attempt at filial piety just before his father's death. Another reason was his unstable income as he had been doing mostly pro bono work as well as spending time on grassroots work and giving motivational talks.

In 2017, Tan started his own law firm, Invictus Law Corporation, with personal loans from some close friends. Going forward, he aims to strike a balance between paid and pro bono work.

== Teaching ==
Tan teaches Part B of the Singapore Bar Examination on Criminal Litigation.

== Notable cases ==
Tan had taken on more than 500 cases and earned a reputation for taking on controversial cases, many a time pro bono.

Josephus Tan represented 20-year-old Soh Wee Kian, who was then charged with murdering a 32-year-old clerk Hoe Hong Lin during the night of Mid-Autumn Festival in September 2010, as well as stabbing three other women in three separate cases. Tan and two other lawyers made representations for the murder charge to be reduced on the grounds of diminished responsibility, after a psychiatrist diagnosed Soh to be suffering from adjustment disorder with a depressed mood, and eventually, in August 2013, Soh pleaded guilty to a reduced charge of manslaughter and one count of voluntarily inflicting grievous hurt, and sentenced to life imprisonment.

Tan represented 18-year-old youth and secret society member Ng Wei Lun, who was part of the 12-member gang attacking 19-year-old Darren Ng Wei Jie at Downtown East, resulting in the death of the student. Initially charged with murder, Ng was sentenced to 3 years and 3 months' imprisonment and 3 strokes of the cane for rioting, the lightest sentence received compared to his other 11 fellow gang members, who were sentenced to imprisonment between 4 and 12 years and caning between 3 and 12 strokes of the cane for rioting and culpable homicide. Tan also represented another of Ng Wei Lun's gang, Chong Rui Hong, who was given 4 years' imprisonment and 3 strokes of the cane for rioting as well.

In 2015, Tan represented Ng Yao Wei, a former Singapore Polytechnic student who had killed his brother at their family home in Choa Chu Kang. Ng was initially charged with murder, which carries the death penalty, but was later sentenced to seven years' jail on a lesser charge of culpable homicide as he was assessed to be suffering from major depressive disorder.

In 2016, Tan acted for Lee Wai Leong, the suspect in a case of animal abuse in Yishun. K. Shanmugam, the Law Minister, had called upon Tan to represent Lee for free. Lee, who had the mentality of a child, suffers from fits of epilepsy and seizures on an almost daily basis. He was accused of hurling a cat down from the 13th floor of a HDB block of flats. His parents have expressed disbelief and sought legal aid as they were unable to afford a lawyer.

In 2017, Tan defended the couple accused in the Annie Ee case. Ee had been subjected to physical and mental abuse for a period of eight months until she died from her injuries in her sleep. Tan, who acted for the accused, said that Ee's death was "unexpected and unintended", and a case of "discipline gone wrong". Tan Hui Zhen, one of the accused, was also suffering from depression due to her past miscarriages and had also been abused by her family previously. The High Court eventually found the couple guilty of voluntarily causing grievous hurt with dangerous weapons and sentenced Tan Hui Zhen to 16½ years' jail and her husband Pua Hak Chuan to 14 years' jail and 14 strokes of the cane for their "extremely cruel and inhumane" abuse.

In February 2021, Tan represented 24-year-old Tan Hong Sheng, one of the seven people accused of murdering Satheesh Noel Gobidass at Orchard Towers on 2 July 2019. Hong Sheng was initially charged with murder, but after investigations revealed that it was Hong Sheng's friend Tan Sen Yang who directly attacked and stabbed Satheesh, the AGC dismissed the murder charge. Hong Sheng pled guilty to the charges he faced on 5 February 2021, and a month later, on 5 March 2021, Hong Sheng was sentenced to 4 years and 9 months' jail and 12 strokes of the cane.

In 2020, Tan was hired to represent Foo Li Ping, a divorced mother charged with murdering her four-year-old daughter and only child Megan Khung, whom she allegedly killed before burning her body. Foo's boyfriend Wong Shi Xiang was also charged with killing the child, while the couple's friend Nouvelle Chua Ruo Shi was charged with helping to dispose of the corpse.

In 2021, Tan was set to defend 29-year-old Huang Bocan, the older brother of 19-year-old Huang Baoying who was found dead in their Clementi flat after being assaulted by her brother and two other people. Huang, who allegedly used a wooden stick to hit his sister, was initially charged with voluntarily causing grievous hurt before it was upgraded to murder. His two accomplices, 62-year-old Lim Peng Tiong and 41-year-old Chee Mei Wan, were also indicted for murder.

== Appointments ==
From 2006 to 2007, Tan took office as the President of the United Kingdom Singapore Law Students Society (UKSLSS) during his final year in the UK.

From 2013 to 2014, Tan served in the Council of the Law Society of Singapore.

In 2016, Tan was appointed to the select panel for admissions to the Singapore University of Social Sciences School of Law.

In 2017, Tan was appointed by Law Minister K. Shanmugam as a member to the National Council Against Drug Abuse.

In January 2018, Tan was appointed by Halimah Yacob, the President of Singapore, to the Youth Court as a Panel Advisor. In addition, he was also appointed by the Law Society as Chairman for its Law Awareness Committee.

== Awards and honours ==
Tan was conferred the Pro Bono Ambassador of the Year award by the Law Society in 2013.

In 2013, Tan was also awarded the Junior Chamber International's Ten Outstanding Young Persons of the World (Singapore) Merit Award.

In July 2015, Tan received the Singapore Youth Award given out by the National Youth Council. He was a past recipient of the CLAS Scheme Gold Award as well.

== Charitable work ==
Starting from May 2014, he spends a lot of his time giving motivational talks to schools, associations and business organisations.

In July 2015, Tan gave free legal talks at Choa Chu Kang Community Club to educate the public about Singapore's penal laws, criminal procedures, sentencing principles and criminal court structures.

== In the media ==
Tan's first appearance in the media was in July 2012, when he was featured on Mediacorp Channel 5's On The Edge to talk about prevailing youth crimes.

In February 2014, Tan was featured in the Mediacorp Channel 8 current affairs programme Tuesday Report Voices of the Heart. He was also featured in the #LifeReframed campaign, consisting of video interviews with 12 respected luminaries of their life lessons, which was screened at the Singapore International Film Festival.

In January 2015, Tan was interviewed by Channel 8 on their weekday evening news belt Hello Singapore.

In March 2015, Tan's life story was adapted into the Channel U drama, Second Chance. In April 2015, Tan was invited by MediaCorp Channel 5 onto "The 5 Show" to talk about cyberbullying vis-à-vis Singaporean youths.

In July 2015, Tan was invited by Nuyou Singapore to be featured as one of the inspirational individuals for the annual Nuyou TIME photo shoot.

In January 2016, Tan shared about the origin of his passion on Channel 8 Chinese documentary My Parents.

In December 2016, Tan was featured in the Channel NewsAsia documentary series A Fighting Chance about cyber crime situation in Singapore. Also, Tan was invited as a guest judge on a reality TV cooking show, Eat List Star.

In August 2017, Tan was featured in the Channel 8 cooking show, "Hey Chef 2", where he got to learn the ropes from Vincent Aw on how to cook the classic Spanish dish. Tan also appeared on a TV interview on Channel NewsAsia's Prime Time Asia to give his professional take on the "Appropriate Adults" (AA) scheme for juvenile accused persons.

In September 2017, Tan shared his life story on Class 95FM's Mon-SLAY on Cartunes hosted by DJ Jean Danker, on how he turned his life around from a delinquent and alcoholic to hipster lawyer who now spends a third of his time doing pro bono work.

In January 2018, Tan was featured in the Channel 8 docudrama series The Convict that based its stories on past court cases. They are done via re-enactment, and with narrative technique, are intended to be entertaining but at the same time informative and show the investigation and final verdict of the court.

In March 2018, Tan appeared on Channel 8 doing Chinese calligraphy for the Thye Hwa Kwan Charity Show 2018 alongside 17 other MediaCorp artistes, politicians, social media personalities, doctors and celebrity chefs.
