= Fat embolism syndrome =

Entry of fat into the bloodstream

- Other names: Fat embolism
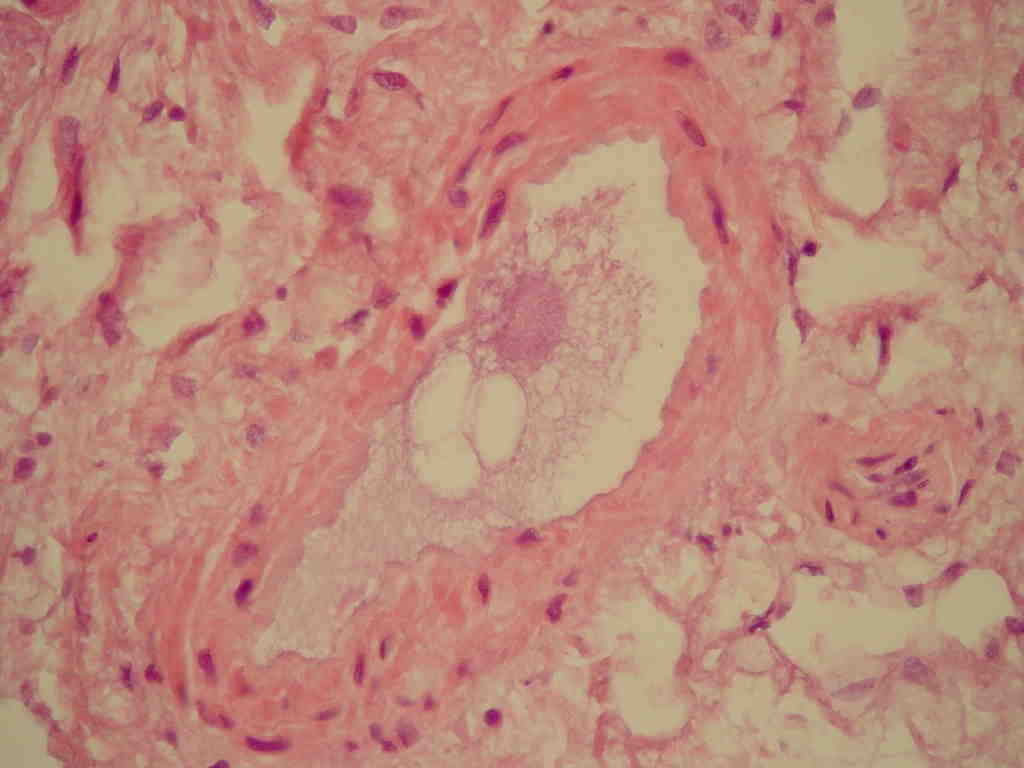
- Microscopic section of the lungs showing a blood vessel with fibrinoid material and an empty space indicative of the presence of lipid dissolved during the staining process. Haematoxylin and eosin stain
- Specialty: Orthopedics, traumatology, pulmonology, intensive care medicine
- Symptoms: Petechial rash, decreased level of consciousness, shortness of breath
- Complications: Personality changes, seizures, Vessel blockage
- Usual onset: Within 24 hours
- Causes: Bone fracture, pancreatitis, bone marrow transplant, liposuction
- Diagnostic method: Based on symptoms
- Differential diagnosis: Pulmonary embolism, pneumonia
- Prevention: Early stabilization of long bone fractures
- Treatment: Supportive care
- Prognosis: 10% risk of death
- Frequency: Rare

Fat embolism syndrome occurs when fat enters the blood stream (fat embolism) and results in symptoms which generally begin within a day. This may include a petechial rash, decreased level of consciousness, and shortness of breath. Other symptoms may include fever and decreased urine output. The risk of death is about 10%.

Fat embolism most commonly occurs as a result of fractures of bones such as the femur or pelvis. Other potential causes include pancreatitis, orthopedic surgery, bone marrow transplant, and liposuction. The underlying mechanism involves widespread inflammation. Diagnosis is based on symptoms.

Treatment is mostly supportive care. This may involve oxygen therapy, intravenous fluids, albumin, and mechanical ventilation. While small amounts of fat commonly occur in the blood after a bone fracture, fat embolism syndrome is rare. The condition was first diagnosed in 1862 by Zenker.

== Signs and symptoms ==
The symptoms of fat embolism syndrome (FES) can start from 12 hours to 3 days after diagnosis of the underlying clinical disease. The three most characteristic features are: respiratory distress, neurological features, and skin petechiae. Respiratory distress (present in 75% of the cases) can vary from mild distress which requires supplemental oxygen to severe distress which requires mechanical ventilation. For neurologic features, those who have FES may become lethargic, restless, with a drop in Glasgow Coma Scale (GCS) due to cerebral oedema rather than cerebral ischaemia. Therefore, neurological signs are not lateralised to one side of the body. In the severe form of cerebral edema, a person may become unresponsive. Petechiae rash usually happens in 50% of the patients. Such skin manifestation is temporary and can disappear within one day. The fat embolism syndrome can be divided into three types:

- Subclinical FES - It manifests as reduced partial pressure of oxygen (PaO2) on arterial blood gas (ABG) with deranged blood parameters (reduced haemoglobin or thrombocytopenia) associated with fever, pain, discomfort, tachypnoea, tachycardia. However, there is no respiratory distress. However, it is often confused with post-operative symptoms of fever, pain, and discomfort.
- Subacute FES (non-fulminant FES) - The three characteristic features of fat embolism are present: respiratory distress, neurological signs, and skin petechiae. Petechiae are seen on the chest, axilla, shoulder, and mouth. Occulsion of dermal capillaries by the fat emboli result in petechial rash. Petechiae rash occurs in 50 to 60% of the cases. Neurologic signs such as confusion, stupor, and coma may be present. These are usually temporary and do not happen on one side of the body. Respiratory distress can be mild and tends to improve on the third day. Retinal changes similar to Purtscher's retinopathy may also be present. Retinal changes happens in 50% of the patients with FES. These are the cotton wool exudates and small haemorrhages along the retinal vessels and macula.
- Fulminant FES - This type of FES is much rarer than the above two types. It usually happens within the first few hours of the injury. The three characteristics of FES existed in the most severe form. Cause of death is usually due to acute right heart failure.

== Causes ==
Orthopaedic injuries, especially fractures of the long bones, are the most common cause of fat embolism syndrome (FES). The rates of fat embolism in long bone fractures vary from 1% to 30%. The mortality rate of fat-embolism syndrome is approximately 10–20%. However, fat globules have been detected in 67% of those with orthopaedic trauma and can reach as high as 95% if the blood is sampled near the fracture site. As the early operative fixation of long bone fractures became a common practice, the incidence of FES has been reduced to between 0.9% and 11%.

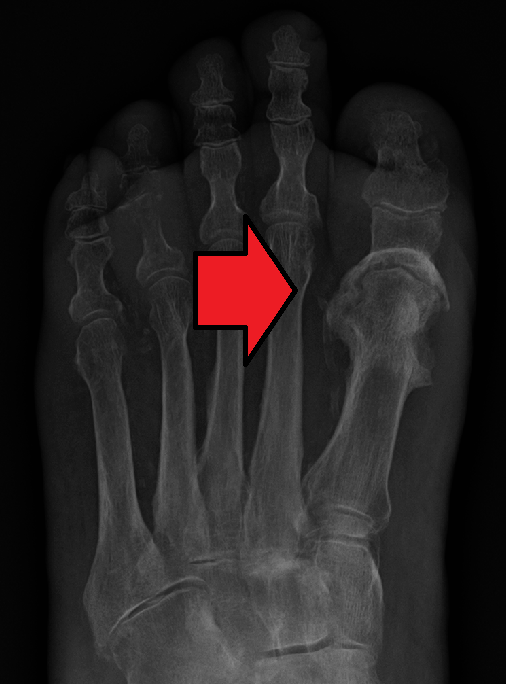
Osteomyelitis

Other rare causes of fat embolism syndrome are:

- Severe burns
- Liver injury
- Closed chest cardiac massage (during cardiopulmonary resuscitation)
- Bone marrow transplantation
- Liposuction
- Parenteral lipid infusion
- Decompression sickness
- Extracorporeal circulation
- Acute haemorrhagic pancreatitis
- Alcoholic liver disease
- Prolonged corticosteriod therapy
- Sickle cell disease
- Carbon tetrachloride poisoning
- Osteomyelitis

== Pathophysiology ==
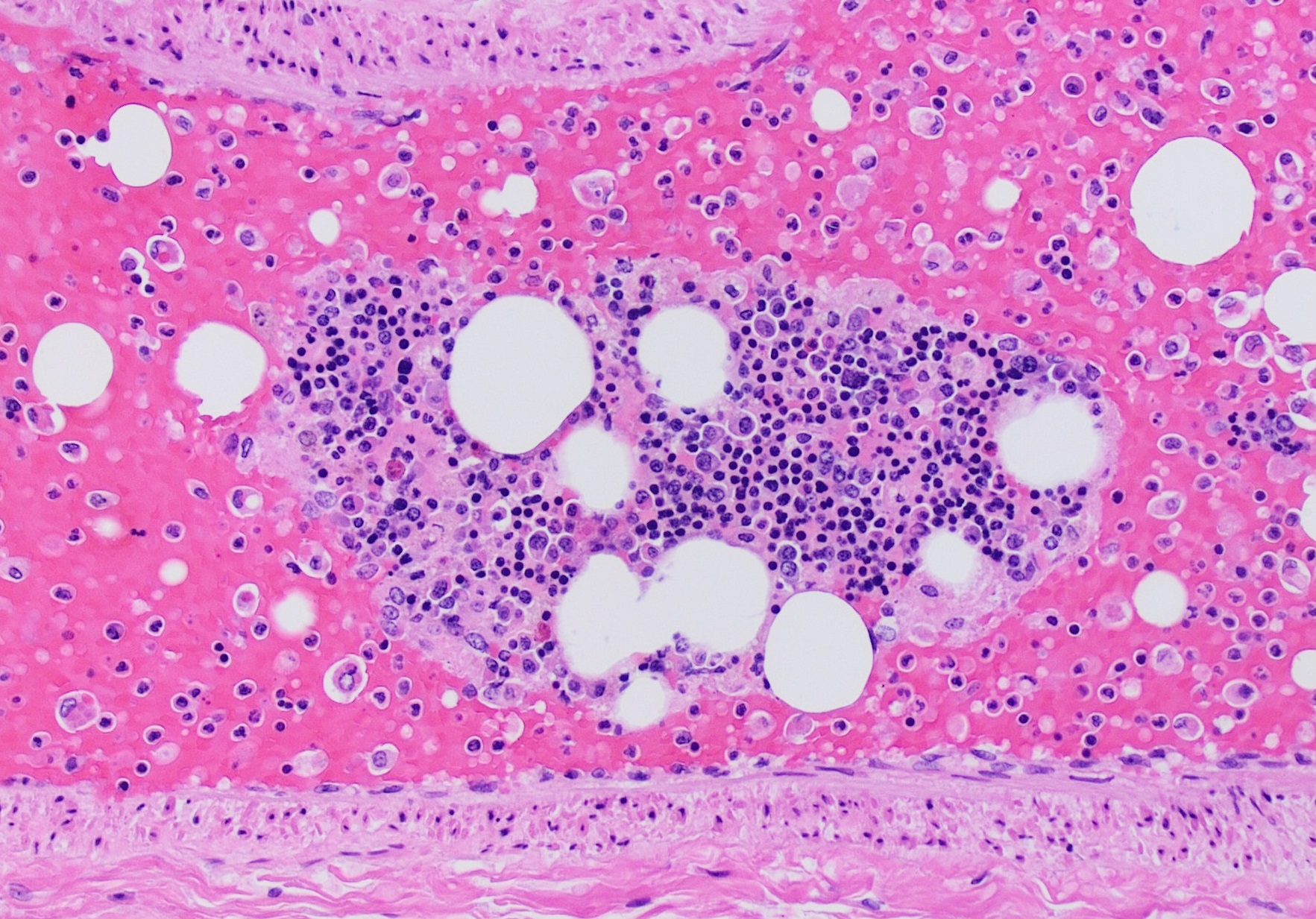
Histopathology of a pulmonary artery with fat embolism (seen as multiple empty globular spaces on this H&E stain since its processing dissolves fat). There is a bone marrow fragment in the middle, and multiple single hematopoietic cells in the blood, being evidence of fracture as the source of the embolism.

Once fat emboli enter the blood circulation, they can lodge at various sites of the body, most commonly in the lungs (up to 75% of cases). However, it can also enter the brain, skin, eyes, kidneys, liver, and heart circulation, causing capillary damage, and subsequently cause organ damage in these areas. There are two theories that describe the formation of a fat embolus:

- Mechanical theory - Following trauma, fat is released directly from the bone marrow into the circulation. This is because after trauma, an elevated pressure in the medullary cavity (central cavity of the bone where the marrow is located) causes the release of fat globules into the venous system supplying the bone. Since venous blood returns to the right heart and is pumped to the lungs for reoxygenation, the fat globules often get lodged in the pulmonary circulation. Fat globules may also pass through lung circulation back into the left ventricle of the heart to be pumped throughout the body in the systemic circulation. They may also reach the systemic circulation through a patent foramen ovale (a hole communicating the right atrium directly to the left atrium of the heart). If fat globules obstruct 80% of the lung capillary network, the resulting back pressure on the right heart increases workload and causes right heart dilatation through cor pulmonale, leading to acute right heart failure.
- Biochemical theory - Following trauma, an inflammation causes bone marrow to liberate fatty acids into the venous circulation. This is achieved through the increased activity of lipoprotein lipase which break down triglycerides into free fatty acids. Both the release of fatty acids and the inflammation causes damage to the capillary beds of the lungs and other organs, causing interstitial lung disease, chemical pneumonitis, and acute respiratory distress syndrome (ARDS). This theory can help to explain non-traumatic causes of fat embolism.

== Diagnosis ==
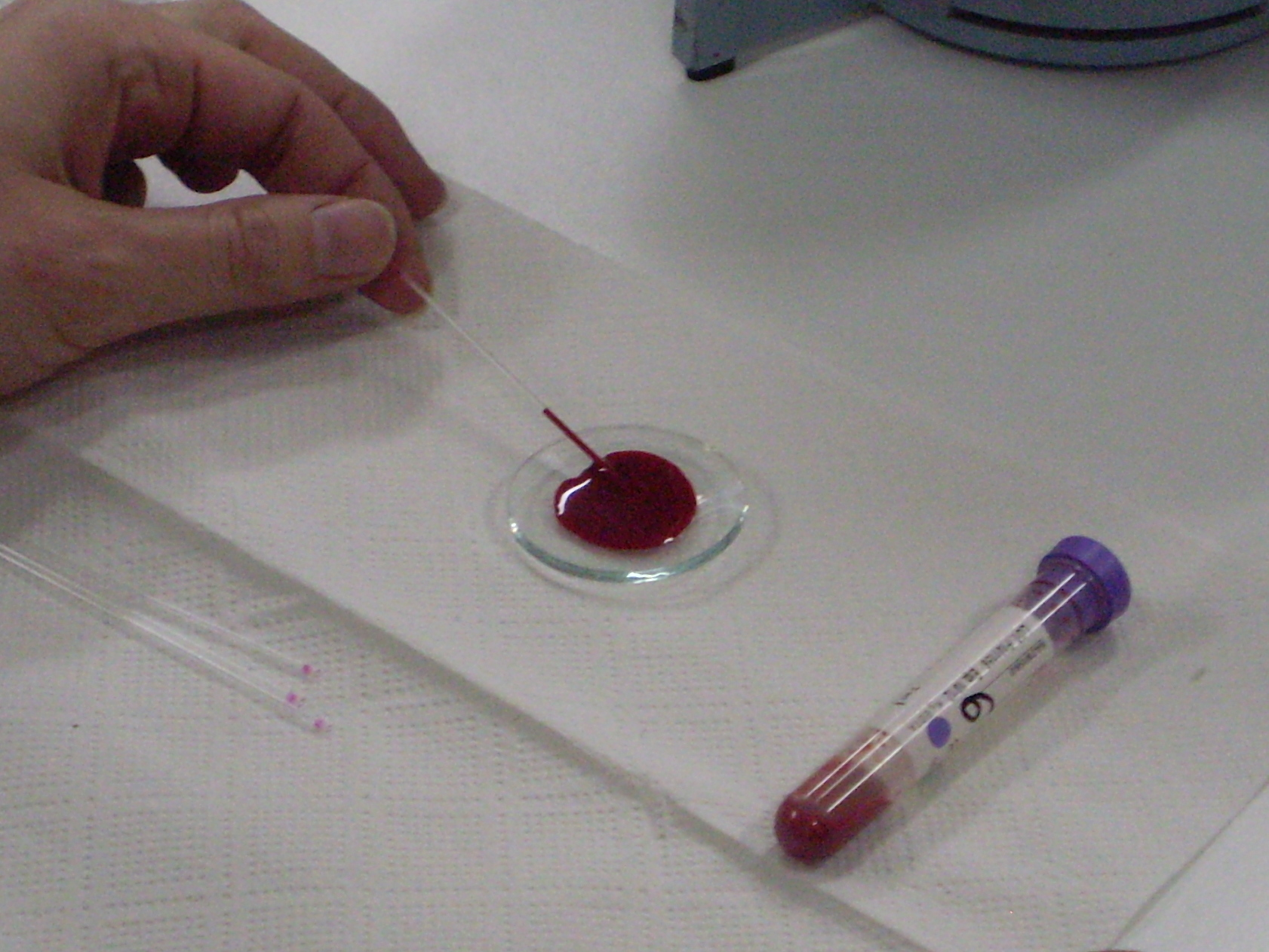
Separator for hematocrit

Fat embolism is presence of fat particles in the micro-circulation of the body. Meanwhile, fat embolism syndrome is the clinical manifestation as the result of fat particles lodging in the body micro-circulation. There are three major diagnostic criteria proposed for fat embolism syndrome, however, none of them are validated and accepted universally. However, Gurd and Wilson's criteria for fat embolism become more commonly used when compared to the other two diagnostic criteria.

=== Gurd and Wilson's criteria ===
Major criteria

- Axillary or subconjunctival petechiae
- Hypoxaemia PaO2 <60 mm Hg, FIO2 = 0.4
- Central nervous system depression disproportionate to hypoxaemia
- Pulmonary oedema

Minor criteria

- Tachycardia more than 110 beats per minute
- Pyrexia more than 38.5 °C
- Fat globules present in urine
- Changes in renal function (reduced urine output)
- Drop in haemoglobin values (more than 20% of the value upon admission)
- Drop in haematocrit values
- Drop in platelet values (more than 50% of the value upon admission)
- Increasing erythrocyte sedimentation rate (ESR) (greater than 71 mm per hour)
- Fat globules present in the sputum
- Emboli present in the retina on fundoscopy

A least two positive major criteria plus one minor criteria or four positive minor criteria are suggestive of fat embolism syndrome. Fat embolism syndrome is a clinical diagnosis. There are no laboratory tests sensitive or specific enough to diagnose FES. Such laboratory tests are only used to support the clinical diagnosis only. Chest X-ray may show diffuse interstitial infiltrates while chest CT scan will show diffuse vascular congestion and pulmonary oedema. Bronchoalveolar lavage has been proposed to look for fat droplets in alveolar macrophages however it is time-consuming and is not specific to fat embolism syndrome. Looking for fat globules in sputum and urine is also not specific enough to diagnose FES.

== Prevention ==
For those treated conservatively with immobilisation of long bone fractures, the incidence of FES is 22%. Early operative fixation of long bone fractures can reduce the incidence of FES especially with the usage of internal fixation devices. Patients undergoing urgent fixation of long bone fractures has a rate of 7% of acute respiratory distress syndrome (ARDS) when compared to those undergoing fixation after 24 hours (39% with ARDS). However, movement of the fracture ends of the long bones during the operative fixation can cause transient increase of fat emboli in the blood circulation. Cytokines are persistently elevated if the long bone fractures is treated conservatively using immobilisation. The cytokine levels would return to normal after operative fixation. Although ream nailing increases pressure in the medullary cavity of the long bones, it does not increase the rates of FES. Other methods such as drilling of holes in the bony cortex, lavaging bone marrow prior to fixation, and the use of tourniquets to prevent embolisation have not been shown to reduce the rates of FES.

Corticosteroid therapy such as methylprednisolone (6 to 90 mg/kg) has been proposed for the treatment of FES, however, it is controversial. Corticosteroid can be used to limit free fatty acid levels, stabilising membranes, and inhibit leukocyte aggregation. A meta-analysis conducted in 2009 reported prophylactic corticosteroids can reduce the risk of FES by 77%. However, there is no difference in mortality, infection, and avascular necrosis when compared to the control group. However, a randomised trial conducted in 2004 reported no differences in FES incidence when comparing treatment with the control group. Administration of corticosteroids for 2 to 3 days is not associated with increased rates of infection. However, there is insufficient data to support the use of methyprednisolone once FES is established.

Heparin has been used in the prevention of venous thrombosis in post-operative patients; however its regular use in those with FES has been contraindicated due to increase risk of bleeding in those with polytrauma. Placement of inferior vena cava filters has been proposed to reduce the amount of emboli going into the lung vascular system, however, this method has not been studied in detail.

== Treatment ==
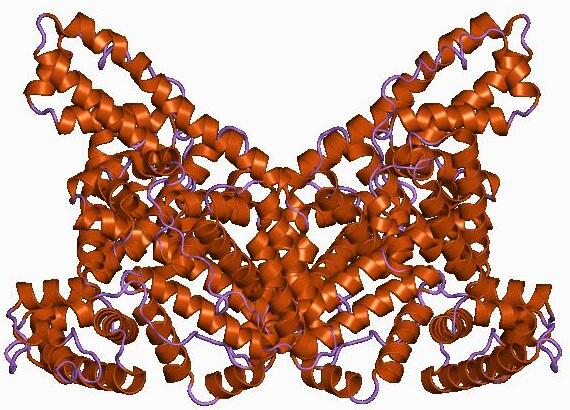
Serum albumin

Once FES develops, the person should be admitted into intensive care unit (ICU), preferably with central venous pressure (CVP) monitoring. CVP monitoring would be helpful to guide the volume resuscitation. Supportive treatment is the only proven treatment method. Supplemental oxygen can be given if a person has mild respiratory distress. However, if a person has severe respiratory distress, either continuous positive pressure ventilation (CPAP), or mechanical ventilation using positive end-expiratory pressure (PEEP) may be indicated. Fluid replacement is required to prevent shock. Volume resuscitation with human albumin is recommended because it can restore blood volume in the circulatory system while also binds to free fatty acids in order to reduce lung injuries. In severe cases, dobutamine should be used to support the right ventricular failure. Frequent Glasgow coma scale (GCS) charting is required to assess the neurological progression of a person with FES. A placement of intracranial pressure monitor may be helpful to direct the treatment of cerebral oedema.

== History ==
In 1861, Zenker first reported on the autopsy findings of fat droplets found in the lungs of a railway worker who died due to severe thoraco-abdominal crush injury. In 1873, Bergmann diagnosed fat embolism clinically in a patient with fractured femur. In 1970, Gurd defined the characteristics of this phenomenon. Gurd later modified the fat embolism criteria together with Wilson, thus producing Gurd and Wilson's criteria for fat embolism syndrome in 1974. In 1983, Schonfeld suggested a scoring system for the diagnosis of fat embolism syndrome. In 1987, Lindeque proposed another scoring system that diagnose fat embolism syndrome by using respiratory changes alone. However, none of them have become universally accepted in the medical community.

In 1978, Formula One racing driver Ronnie Peterson died from FES, after sustaining multiple fractures in a racing accident.

In 2015, Singaporean couple Pua Hak Chuan and Tan Hui Zhen were charged with the abuse and murder of Annie Ee Yu Lian, who died due to multiple physical abuses which lasted for eight months before her death. The cause of death was revealed to be acute fat embolism, which resulted from the blunt force impact caused by the beatings, which led to the fatty tissue entering the bloodstream and eventually entering the blood vessels in the lungs, which led to a blockage and cut off the circulation of oxygenated blood and led to Ee's death by respiratory and cardiac failure. Two years later, for reduced charges of voluntarily causing grievous hurt with a weapon, Tan was sentenced to 16 years and six months in jail while Pua received 14 years' imprisonment and 14 strokes of the cane.
