= Murder of Hoe Hong Lin =

2010 murder of a Malaysian woman during Mid-Autumn Festival in Singapore

Hoe Hong Lin
- Hoe Hong Lin, the 32-year-old clerk who was stabbed to death
- Born: Hoe Hong Lin c. 1978; Malaysia
- Died: 22 September 2010 (aged 32); Woodlands, Singapore
- Cause of death: Murdered
- Occupation: Clerk
- Known for: Murder victim
- Spouse: Ng Kak Joo
- Children: 1 son and 1 daughter

On 22 September 2010, also the Mid-Autumn Festival of 2010, at a park in Woodlands, Singapore, 32-year-old Hoe Hong Lin (Chinese: 何虹玲; Pe̍h-ōe-jī: Hô Hông-lîn; pinyin: Hé Hónglíng), a Malaysian-born Singapore Permanent Resident, was attacked and fatally stabbed in the heart. The killer, 20-year-old Soh Wee Kian (Chinese: 苏伟坚; Pe̍h-ōe-jī: So͘ Úi-kian; pinyin: Sū Wĕijiān), a full-time National Serviceman who went AWOL at the time of the stabbing, was arrested by police while pending trial in a military court for desertion offenses, and charged with murder. It was also discovered that Soh had attacked three more women and stabbed them in a similar fashion as he did to Hoe, after stalking them. Soh, who was found to be suffering from an adjustment disorder with a depressed mood, pleaded guilty to a lesser charge of manslaughter for killing Hoe and another charge of stabbing one of his three surviving victims, and sentenced to life imprisonment on 22 August 2013.

== Death of Hoe Hong Lin ==
On the night of 22 September 2010, which coincided with Mid-Autumn Festival, a 32-year-old woman was attacked and stabbed by an unknown stalker at Mandai Tekong Park in Woodlands. A group of teenagers, who were playing in a nearby basketball court, heard the screams of the victim, and they happened to witness the slim-looking attacker fleeing from the scene and the victim collapsing on the ground from the wounds. One of the boys, 20-year-old Tong Kim Seng, contacted the police and ambulance while his friends tried to help the woman and tend to her. However, the victim died from her wounds.

Dr Wee Keng Poh, the forensic pathologist, examined the body and found that the victim, identified as 32-year-old Hoe Hong Lin, had been stabbed nine times with a possible bladed weapon like a knife, and some of these wounds penetrated the kidneys and heart when inflicted on the chest and back. The cause of Hoe's death was due to a nine cm deep wound that penetrated the heart.

Prior to her death, Hoe, a Malaysian and permanent resident in Singapore, was working as a clerk, and she was the youngest of four children in her family. Hoe was married to her 39-year-old Malaysian husband Ng Kak Joo (also a permanent resident of Singapore), with whom she had one son (aged 12 in 2013) and one daughter (aged eight in 2013); her husband and son were in Singapore for work and studies respectively, and her daughter was living with their relatives in Malaysia at the time she was murdered. Just earlier that night before she was killed, Hoe was celebrating Mid-Autumn Festival with her nephews, her son and husband before she left her flat to escort her nephews home, and after sending her nephews back home, Hoe then walked back home and she was passing through Mandai Tekong Park when the assailant attacked and stabbed her.

Hoe's family were enraged and saddened to hear about Hoe's death; her 70-year-old father, who would die nine months after his daughter's murder, did not dare to tell his seriously ill wife about the death of their daughter when he received the news at the couple's home in Tangkak, Malaysia. Hoe's husband was also saddened and concerned that his son, having caught sight of his mother's corpse, would be traumatized in the future, and the school principal of the boy's school assigned counsellors to help the child to cope with his loss. Hoe's father also said he was unable to find any reason why his daughter died such a brutal death, since she was always a dedicated mother to her children and never had any grudges with people around her.

== Arrest of Hoe's killer ==
The police classified the case of Hoe's death as murder, and they conducted their investigations. It was found that the manner of the attack on Hoe was similar to at least three unsolved cases of knife attacks on women that happened between January and May 2010, and it was therefore determined that the murderer was likely the same perpetrator of these previous three stabbings, and according to the description by the surviving victims and the witnesses, the suspect was a young Chinese male aged in his 20s, and he was also described to of slim and lanky physical build. There were inherent fears by the police back then that another crime would be committed should the suspect was not caught, and hence their investigations were conducted at a greater speed to prevent such a possibility from coming to fruition.

On 14 October 2010, nearly a month after the murder, the police finally identified a possible suspect, and went to Tuas Naval Base, where 20-year-old Soh Wee Kian was incarcerated since 30 September 2010 at the army barracks awaiting court martial for multiple offences of being absent without official leave (AWOL). While he was interviewed by the police, Soh readily confessed that he was responsible for the murder of Hoe Hong Lin, and he was thus arrested.

On 16 October 2010, two days after his arrest, Soh was charged with murder. Soh's arrest brought shock to his family and neighbours, who all described Soh as a mild-mannered, shy and introverted man who rarely got himself into trouble, and he lived with his stepfather and mother and four younger siblings in Woodlands (the same area where Soh killed Hoe). It was also found that some of Soh's family members (including his stepfather, mother and some of his siblings) had previous run-ins with the law for unrelated offences, and one of Soh's younger brothers was imprisoned at a juvenile home as of the time Soh was captured, and another brother of Soh was suffering from leukaemia. Josephus Tan, a notable criminal lawyer, agreed to represent Soh for free after Soh's stepfather approached his services and having considered the precarious financial situation of Soh's family. Soh's biological father was revealed to be schizophrenic, which made people speculate that Soh could have inherited the disease from his birth father.

During the investigations of Hoe's murder, it was confirmed that Soh Wee Kian had stabbed three young women in Yishun and Sembawang on three separate occasions between January and May 2010: in January 2010, Soh used a knife to cause hurt to 31-year-old Ooi Li Li at a void deck in Yishun. In February 2010, at a park in Yishun, Soh attacked 23-year-old Lam Hui Lin after trailing her, and injured her with a knife as a result. In May 2010, at a void deck in Sembawang, Soh used a knife to cause hurt to 25-year-old How Poh Ling while stalking and attacking her. For these above three incidents, Soh was brought back to court to be charged with three counts of attempted murder. If found guilty of the most serious charge of murder, Soh Wee Kian would be sentenced to death by hanging.

== Soh Wee Kian's background and motive ==
Soh Wee Kian
- Soh Wee Kian, who was charged with murdering Hoe Hong Lin
- Born: Soh Wee Kian; 1990 (age 35–36); Singapore
- Parent(s): Ng Chee Yong (stepfather); Soh Piah Sing (father)
- Status: Imprisoned at Changi Prison since 14 October 2010
- Motive: Unknown
- Convictions: Manslaughter (one count); Voluntarily causing grievous hurt (one count)
- Criminal charges: Murder (one count); Attempted murder (three counts)
- Penalty: Life imprisonment (x2; concurrent)

Born in 1990, Soh was the eldest of five children (including his three younger brothers and one half-sister) and came from a dysfunctional family background. His biological parents divorced in 2002 and his mother remarried in 2003, and therefore bore Soh's half-sister. Soh himself completed his N-levels, and he was expelled from secondary Four due to a serious disciplinary offence. At the time he was arrested, Soh served his National Service in the Republic of Singapore Navy (RNS) but he often went AWOL.

During his psychiatric remand, it was revealed that Soh had begun stalking women at the age of eleven, and fantasized about touching their breasts, kissing them and even stabbing them on the back out of a possible sexual purpose. Specifically, Soh would be tailing schoolgirls and women, especially if they were pretty, sporting long hair and were wearing skirts (these traits coincided with the ones possessed by Hoe and the other three victims). Over the years, he did it on and off. This habit escalated in 2010, and it resulted in Soh acting on his fantasies and knifing his four victims from January 2010 to September 2010, resulting in the murder of Hoe Hong Lin and the serious injuries of three others. It was also revealed that on the day of Hoe's murder, Soh became sexually attracted to Hoe's beauty and even wanted to steal her IPhone after catching sight of it, because he needed money to buy new lanterns for his younger sister. Therefore, he stalked Hoe and ambushed her from behind, and as Hoe resisted, Soh stabbed her several times, and it caused Hoe to die from the brutal stabbing.

According to a psychiatric report from Dr Jerome Goh, the prosecution's psychiatrist, Soh was suffering from an adjustment disorder with a depressed mood. Dr Goh stated that this was a result of the stress Soh experienced in national service and it also substantially impaired his mental responsibility at the time of the offences committed between January and September 2010. Dr Tommy Tan, the defence's psychiatrist, he found that Soh, who reportedly had a family history of schizophrenia, was suffering from schizotypal disorder, which involves a preference for social isolation and paranoid beliefs. Like Dr Goh, Dr Tan determined that he had a mental impairment at the time of the stabbings. However, Dr Goh's psychiatric report was accepted while Dr Tan's psychiatric opinion was rejected by the prosecution.

== Trial of Soh Wee Kian ==
On 7 August 2013, the prosecution, in view of the psychiatric reports of Soh's case, offered to reduce the murder charge against Soh, on the account that he would plead guilty and that the prosecution were entitled to seek the maximum punishment available for the reduced charge. Soh agreed to plead guilty, and the prosecution therefore reduced the charge of murder to a lesser offence of culpable homicide not amounting to murder, also known as manslaughter in Singapore's legal terms. The reduction of the murder charge allowed Soh to escape the death penalty for murdering Hoe Hong Lin.

On 20 August 2013, 23-year-old Soh Wee Kian pleaded guilty to one count of manslaughter, and one count of voluntarily causing grievous hurt in relation to the stabbing of How Poh Ling, and the other two charges of causing hurt to both Ooi Li Li and Lam Hui Lin were consented to be taken into consideration during sentencing, and his sentencing was scheduled to take place two days later. The prosecution was led by Adrian Loo, Ruth Wong and Ong Luan Tze, while Soh himself was represented by Thangavelu, Josephus Tan and Keith Lim. The trial was presided by Justice Choo Han Teck of the High Court. The maximum punishment for both charges of manslaughter and causing grievous hurt was life imprisonment, with a possible fine or caning.

The prosecution sought a life sentence in Soh's case, citing that based on his condition, there was a need to isolate him from society for as long as it was permissible by law while keeping him in a controlled environment during that period itself to ensure the safety of others and Soh himself, due to the inherent risk and danger he posed to himself and other people around him. They also stated that the grave nature of Hoe's death and the stabbing of three other victims and Soh's motive of stalking women were demonstrative of his unstable character and propensity to re-offend, and hence the court should award Soh the maximum punishment of life for both counts of manslaughter and inflicting grievous hurt. The defence did not object to the prosecution's submissions, but they asked that caning should not be imposed on behalf of Soh's psychiatric condition.

Two days after Soh pleaded guilty, on 22 August 2013, Justice Choo Han Teck delivered his verdict on sentence. Justice Choo commented during sentencing that given Soh's adjustment disorder and the magnitude of his crimes, it was in the best interests of Soh and the society in general that he should impose the maximum punishment he was bound to hand down as a judge, which he felt was the "most appropriate" length of imprisonment for 23-year-old Soh Wee Kian. Therefore, Soh Wee Kian was sentenced to two terms of life imprisonment, one for manslaughter and one for causing grievous hurt, and the judge ordered that both of Soh's life sentences should run concurrently and be backdated to the date of his arrest. Justice Choo also agreed to the defence's request to not subject Soh to caning. After being sentenced to two concurrent life sentences for his crimes, Soh was allowed to speak to his family before leaving court. He reportedly expressed his regret for his actions, and Soh's stepfather Ng Chee Yong wanted to apologize to the victim's family for what his eldest stepson had done.

As for Hoe's husband and family, they were understandably disappointed with the verdict. Hoe's husband Ng Kak Joo stated that he was disappointed that Soh would not face the death penalty, much less caning for murdering his wife, and although he accepted the life sentence, he stated that Soh had destroyed the life he spent 20 years to build up in Singapore by killing his wife, and he would inform his children about the verdict. Hoe's family similarly also stated they wished for Soh to be sentenced to death, but they had to accept life imprisonment as the second best option. In Ng's words, he said, "The one who died wasn't supposed to. The one who should die isn't going to."

By the order of Abdul Nasir Amer Hamsah's landmark appeal on 20 August 1997, life imprisonment is to be defined as a term of incarceration lasting the remainder of a convict's natural lifespan, instead of the old definition of life imprisonment as 20 years in prison. The changes to the law was to be applied to future cases that took place after 20 August 1997. Since Soh committed the offence of manslaughter on 22 September 2010, about 13 years and one month after the landmark ruling, Soh would be imprisoned for the remainder of his whole life, unless he became eligible for release on parole after completing at least 20 years of his jail term.

== Aftermath ==
Before the sentencing of Soh Wee Kian to a life term, his manslaughter conviction brought attention to the public. There were questions revolving the reason why Soh, who had randomly stabbed four women and even caused the death of one of the victims, was spared the gallows. There were questions also directed at the anti-death penalty activists for their longstanding advocacy for the abolition of capital punishment based on the sacred right to life, given that the general public were unable to come to terms with allowing a murderer to remain alive in prison while depending on the money of taxpayers when the death penalty could be imposed to execute such heinous criminals. The murder of Hoe Hong Lin was regarded as one of the shocking crimes that happened in Singapore prior to 2014.

Even after Soh Wee Kian was sentenced to life in prison, members of his family continually made the news for unrelated offences in the following years since his sentencing. In 2015, it was reported that Soh's younger brother Soh Wee Boon was sentenced to jail for four months after he pleaded guilty to one count each of criminal intimidation and insulting a woman's modesty, and Soh's stepfather was jailed for a drug-related offence in another case. In 2016, Soh Wee Boon, who was diagnosed with gender identity disorder and mild intellectual disability, was jailed for two months for similar offences, and in 2019, he was also given a jail term of 11 months, two weeks and 90 days for one charge of harassment and two charges of insulting the modesty of a woman. Soh's mother was also in prison for an unknown offence in 2019.

In 2018, Soh's biological father Soh Piah Sing was interviewed with regards to the cases of his two sons - Soh and Soh's younger brother Wee Boon. Soh's father expressed sadness and remorse that his two biological sons had broken the law and committed serious offences, and he also revealed that he had gone astray once as a young man but he turned around and tried guiding his children on the right path, and lamented his failure as a father. Soh's father stated that when Soh had killed Hoe Hong Lin eight years ago, he was deeply shocked and saddened at how Soh actually took a life, and he stated as a father, his son's crime of killing a person had made him tantamount to a murderer as well.

In June 2022, local writer Foo Siang Luen wrote the second volume of his real-life crime book Justice Is Done, which was published by the Singapore Police Force (including a digital download-for-free e-book version) 17 years after Foo wrote the first volume. The book recorded some of the gruesome murder cases encountered and solved by police throughout the years between 2005 and 2016, and the 2010 case of Soh Wee Kian was recorded as one of these cases covered in the book.

In November 2023, 13 years after the stabbing, Singaporean crime show, titled Inside Crime Scene, re-enacted the case of Soh Wee Kian and aired the adaptation as the second episode of the show's second season. Psychiatric and forensic experts were interviewed to give their analysis of Soh's mental state and his modus operandi of stalking women before stabbing them; it was agreed that Soh's motive for the serial stabbings and indiscriminate violence were because of the sexual fantasies he had, which led to him wanting to fulfill them and therefore turned to violence to satisfy his desires. Noting that Soh initially used an army switchblade to stab his first victims before switching to a longer knife for his later stabbings, it psychologically indicated that Soh's manifestations to commit violence had grown stronger by the time he killed Hoe.

Soh's former lawyer Josephus Tan was also interviewed on the show, speaking about his feelings and experience of defending Soh in court. Tan stated that while he and his fellow lawyers managed to secure a plea bargain and have the murder charge reduced, the court still sentenced Soh to be jailed for life due to the fact that Soh's highly unstable psychiatric condition and aggravating circumstances of his serial stabbings had convinced the trial judge that Soh should be locked away for the longest period of time possible, and he noted that from his client's case, it was rare for a person facing multiple charges to receive more than one life sentence in Singapore's jurisdiction, although these double life terms in Soh's case were ordered to be executed simultaneously and concurrently. According to Tan, he had recently visited Soh in prison sometime prior to the show's broadcast, and during the visit itself, Soh told him that he wanted to apologize to the families of his victims, revealing that Soh was still remorseful for what he had done. Soh's former secondary school classmate, Shen Maoquan, was also interviewed in the show; he described Soh as a quiet and sincere friend who never liked saying jokes, and ever since they left secondary school, Shen lost contact with Soh and he was genuinely shocked to discover that Soh was the perpetrator of Hoe's murder when the case first made headlines on the news.

Since October 2010, Soh remains in Changi Prison, where he is currently serving his life sentence. But he has the possibility of parole after completing a minimum period of twenty years in jail.

== See also ==
- Life imprisonment in Singapore
- List of major crimes in Singapore
- List of people sentenced to more than one life imprisonment
