= Yves-Gérard Illouz =

French surgeon (1929–2015)

Yves-Gérard Illouz (also known as Gérard Illiouz; September 12, 1929 – January 21, 2015) was a French surgeon who developed safer methods of liposuction. He was a co-founder of Médecins Sans Frontières (Doctors Without Borders).

== Early life and education ==
Illouz was born in Oran, at the time of his birth part of the colony of French Algeria. He studied in France, earning a bachelor's degree in arts and philosophy and in 1968 a medical degree as General Surgeon from the Medical College of Paris.

== Career ==
In 1972 Illouz was a co-founder of Médecins Sans Frontières.

In the late 1970s, Illouz developed a safer and easier method of liposuction. His "Illouz Method", introduced in 1982 and first published in Annales de Chirurgie Plastique in 1984, was a "wet method" using blunt cannulas, rather than sharp, and of smaller size than previously, in order to minimise bleeding while injecting saline solution into the subcutaneous fat deposits, breaking up the fat for extraction by suction. He referred to his method of aspiration as "collassoplasty". He published La Sculpture chirurgicale par Lipoplastie in 1988. He was not admitted to the French society of plastic surgeons until 1989.

In 2010, he established the Illouz Foundation for the study of adipose-derived stem cell therapy.

== Personal life ==
Illouz had two sons.
