= Excess skin =

Surplus skin and fat after weight loss or pregnancy

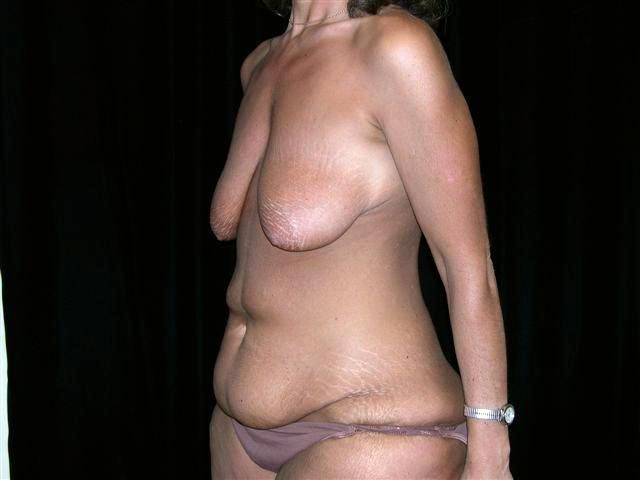
A 35-year-old woman with excess abdominal skin and sagging breasts due to weight loss.

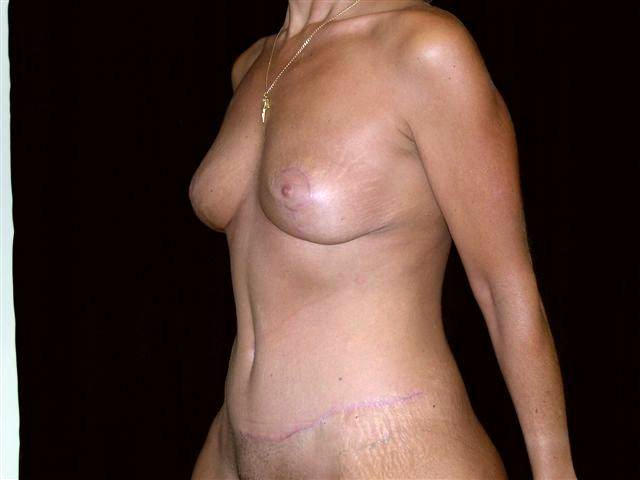
The same woman six months after undergoing an abdominoplasty and breast lift.

Excess skin is an effect of surplus skin and fat after expansion during pregnancy or adipositas and following a massive and considerable weight loss. Further reasons can be aging effects, genetic disorders or an intentional expansion for skin reconstruction. Due to the elastic nature of the skin, there is generally some improvement over time. Excessive loose skin can be permanent to a degree but surgical treatment is an option.

Methods to remove excess skin by surgery include abdominoplasty, breast reduction and brachioplasty.

== Notable cases ==
In 1994, 60 Minutes covered the mystery of Tomm Tennent, a young man "born hugely wrinkled by an excess of skin". Per 60 Minutes, Tennent was then the only person in the world with this congenital condition. He was born in 1992 with a great excess of skin, which hung about him in many wrinkles. As he grew towards adulthood, he "grew into" his skin, as into an oversize garment, and the wrinkles flattened out. His condition is compared to Shar Pei dog puppies, which have this condition also; the boy and Shar Pei puppies in their skins both have 10 times the normal level of hyaluronic acid.

In March 2015, Kaitlyn Smith shared her experience after losing 208 pounds ("half her size"), having once weighed more than 400 lbs.

In September 2020, Biggest Loser trainer Erica Lugo underwent a 360 tummy tuck. Having quickly lost over 160 lbs, Lugo was left with 8.5 lbs of excess skin. People covered the pre- and post- op experience. Lugo told People the decision to get surgery was not easy, but that she had a "new body" and was "floored" at the postoperative results.

== TLC Skin Tight TV show ==
TLC Skin Tight is a TV show with each episode following “two people who have lost massive amounts of weight and are about to undergo a full body transformation through skin removal surgery.” “It’s not unusual, says the show, for there to be “up to 50 pounds” of sagging skin following massive weight loss. Skin Tight ran for three seasons and 33 episodes, with the first episode airing 6 January 2016, and the last 20 May 2018.

== Literature ==
- Trude Staalesen: Assessment of Excess Skin and Outcome of Body Contouring Surgery in Post Bariatric Patients. Department of Plastic Surgery, Institute of Clinical Sciences at Sahlgrenska Academy, University of Gothenburg, Gothenburg 2014 (pdf)
- Mammoreduction - The goal to shrink the woman's breasts Brustverkleinerung in der Schweiz | Ablauf und Kosten | mol.ch
