= Murder of Ng Yao Cheng =

2015 case of man fatally stabbing his brother in Singapore

Ng Yao Cheng
- Born: Ng Yao Cheng; 7 July 1988; Singapore
- Died: 13 April 2015 (aged 26); Choa Chu Kang, Singapore
- Cause of death: Fatal stab wounds
- Other name: Morris
- Education: Nanyang Polytechnic
- Occupation: Motion graphics designer
- Known for: His murder
- Parents: Ng Soon Guan (father); Gan Chai Min (mother)
- Family: Unnamed eldest brother Ng Yao Wei (youngest brother and killer); Unnamed grandmother

On 13 April 2015, inside their condominium in Choa Chu Kang, Singapore, 26-year-old motion graphics designer Ng Yao Cheng (黄耀成 Huáng Yàochéng) was attacked and stabbed to death by his youngest brother during an argument. The suspect, 21-year-old polytechnic graduate Ng Yao Wei (黄耀伟 Huáng Yàowěi), was arrested and charged with murder. It was revealed through investigations and trial that Ng Yao Wei had been relentlessly abused by his older brother and this long-standing resentment culminated into the stabbing. After it came to light through psychiatric assessments that Ng was suffering from depression at the time of his brother's murder, Ng's murder charge was reduced to manslaughter and he was sentenced to seven years' imprisonment on 19 September 2016.

== Fatal stabbing ==
On the night of 13 April 2015, at a condominium in Singapore's Choa Chu Kang, a fight between two brothers ended with the death of one of them, and another was arrested for his murder.

The incident happened presumably before 11 PM, and the police received a report at this time in relation to the stabbing incident. The domestic maid and mother of the two brothers were said to have witnessed the stabbing, and while the mother tried to stop the bleeding on the neck of one of her sons, who was her second child, the maid ran out to call for help, and 25-year-old security officer Thinesh Muniady was prompted to go to the unit. Thinesh witnessed the scene and decided to call the police. At the same time, the other brother involved in the crime also called the police, admitting that he stabbed his brother. The father and eldest brother of the suspect were not present at the unit when the stabbing happened. First-hand reports revealed that the suspect and the victim were not on good terms despite being brothers and having shared the same room. Neighbours also told the police that the two brothers often argued with each other and loud arguments were often heard from the unit itself.

After the arrival of paramedics, the 26-year-old victim, identified Ng Yao Cheng (alias Morris Ng), was pronounced dead at the scene of crime. His youngest brother, 21-year-old Ng Yao Wei (alias Cedric Ng), was also injured and was conveyed to hospital to receive treatment.

== Murder charge ==
On 15 April 2015, 21-year-old Ng Yao Wei was charged with the murder of his 26-year-old brother Ng Yao Cheng. Ng was charged in Changi General Hospital where he was hospitalized for the injuries he sustained. Under Singapore law, Ng would be sentenced to death should he be convicted of murder.

Leading criminal lawyer Josephus Tan of Fortis Law Corporation agreed to represent Ng on a pro bono basis, after Ng's parents sought his help to take their youngest son's case.

== Background ==
Ng Yao Cheng, the second of three sons in his family, was born on 7 July 1988. Yao Cheng completed his education at Nanyang Polytechnic in 2008 and became a motion graphics designer. He was reportedly talented in his field of work and formerly employed under various big companies like Bruce Dunlop Associates. Many of Yao Cheng's co-workers praised his work performance and dedication to design, which he viewed as a "repayment back to society." His works were displayed and commended overseas.

Ng Yao Wei, born in 1994, was the youngest of three sons and six years younger than Yao Cheng. Ng, who graduated from Singapore Polytechnic, was reportedly an avid gamer and anime lover, and he had once got into trouble with the authorities for illegally downloading games. He was formerly a student of ITE College Central before he graduated with good grades and entered Singapore Polytechnic, where he completed a course in business information technology and even earned a place on the Director's Honour Roll during his second year.

However, in their personal lives, Ng and his second brother reportedly did not have a good relationship. For the past five years, for unknown reasons, Yao Cheng began to abuse Ng verbally and physically. The brothers would additionally quarrel over trivial matters very often. Also, Yao Cheng had a bad temper and often had differences between himself and his immediate family members, but it was the worst for Ng.

== Ng Yao Wei's confession ==
The following was the statement of facts given by Ng Yao Wei about the murder of Ng Yao Cheng.

On 12 April 2015, the day before Ng Yao Wei murdered his older brother, he invited his two friends over to play computer games. Yao Cheng angrily confronted Ng and his friends for making too much noise, and in retaliation, Ng retorted, calling his brother a "dog" in Chinese. This nearly escalated into a fight before Ng's father managed to defuse the situation and asked Yao Cheng to go back to his room. According to Ng's confession, Yao Cheng viciously swore to murder Ng should he continue making too much noise. Ng, who felt humiliated and enraged for being scolded in front of his friends, in addition to feeling threatened by his brother's death threat, decided to bring a knife out of the kitchen and hid it under his pillow inside his room, which he shared with Yao Cheng.

The unhappy feelings lingered on inside Ng's mind till the next day, and the following night on 13 April 2015, the same day he murdered his brother, Ng once again confronted Yao Cheng for embarrassing him in front of his friends the night before. This sparked a verbal war between the brothers as they exchanged angry words with each other. At one point, Ng called his brother an expletive and it caused Yao Cheng to lunge towards Ng. Before Yao Cheng could reach Ng, Ng reached for the knife under his pillow, brandished it and used it to repeatedly stabbed his brother.

This commotion attracted the attention of Ng's mother and the domestic maid, who all witnessed the stabbing. Horrified, Ng's mother rushed to help Yao Cheng to stop the bleeding on his neck. However, Yao Cheng died due to massive blood loss from his wounds. Ng later called the police, who arrived and arrested him for murdering 26-year-old Ng Yao Cheng. An autopsy report revealed that Yao Cheng suffered 22 knife wounds, and three of them were sufficient in the ordinary course of nature to cause death; two of them penetrated the lungs and a third went through the neck.

== Trial of Ng Yao Wei ==
On 19 September 2016, 22-year-old Ng Yao Wei stood trial for fatally stabbing his second brother Yao Cheng. By then, the charge of murder against Ng had been lowered to a lesser charge of culpable homicide not amounting to murder, or manslaughter in Singapore's legal context. It was found during his psychiatric remand that as a result of his brother's abuse, Ng suffered from severe depression at the time of his offence, which impaired his mental responsibility, and Ng actually sought medical help in secret in November 2014 for this condition. As such, before his trial started, the prosecution agreed to reduce Ng's murder charge on the grounds of diminished responsibility, allowing Ng to escape the death penalty for murdering Yao Cheng.

During a hearing convened before Judicial Commissioner Audrey Lim at the High Court, Ng, who was represented by notable criminal lawyer Josephus Tan, pleaded guilty to the manslaughter of his brother, and was scheduled to be sentenced on the same date. The defence proposed that Ng should be jailed for not more than seven years, as he was a "quiet and timid" person who had been relentlessly subjected to longstanding physical and verbal abuse by Yao Cheng, who often used him as a "punching bag" and, as partly caused by depression, Ng heard Yao Cheng's death threats and they caused him to conceal a knife out of fear for his life. Tan also commented on the tragic situation faced by Ng and his family alike: "His parents have already lost one son and they are here today to see another son sentenced."

The prosecution, led by Deputy Public Prosecutor Ma Hanfeng, sought seven to ten years' jail, and submitted that Ng should be given a longer jail term to ensure that his condition was kept in check sufficiently before he could return to society in the future. They acknowledged the tragic circumstances surrounding the death of Ng's brother. The psychiatric report cited that Ng had a low risk of re-offending and he would need at least two years of observation to ensure his condition would improve.

After mulling over the submissions from both sides, Judicial Commissioner Audrey Lim sentenced 22-year-old Ng Yao Wei to seven years' imprisonment. She described the killing of Ng Yao Cheng as a "truly unfortunate" case of a brother killing a brother. She took into consideration the nature of the stabbing, as well as the long-term acrimonious relationship between Ng and his brother, before passing sentence.

Over 30 of Ng's family members and friends were present in the courtroom during his sentencing. Ng's father was reportedly very emotional and wept as he conversed with his youngest son. Ng's 87-year-old grandmother also reminded her youngest grandson in Teochew to take care of himself and eat whatever food he received in prison, promising Ng that the whole family would wait for him to come back and hoped to live till Ng was released. Ng's oldest brother, parents and family wrote letters to the judge to plead for leniency, citing that Ng was an obedient and polite person who was well-behaved, and they had long forgiven him for killing Yao Cheng, and they were willing to support him and allow him move back home once he came out of prison.

Ng Yao Wei was released from Changi Prison in 2022 after completing his seven-year sentence.

== See also ==
- List of major crimes in Singapore
