= Abdominoplasty =

Surgical procedure to make the abdomen thinner and firmer

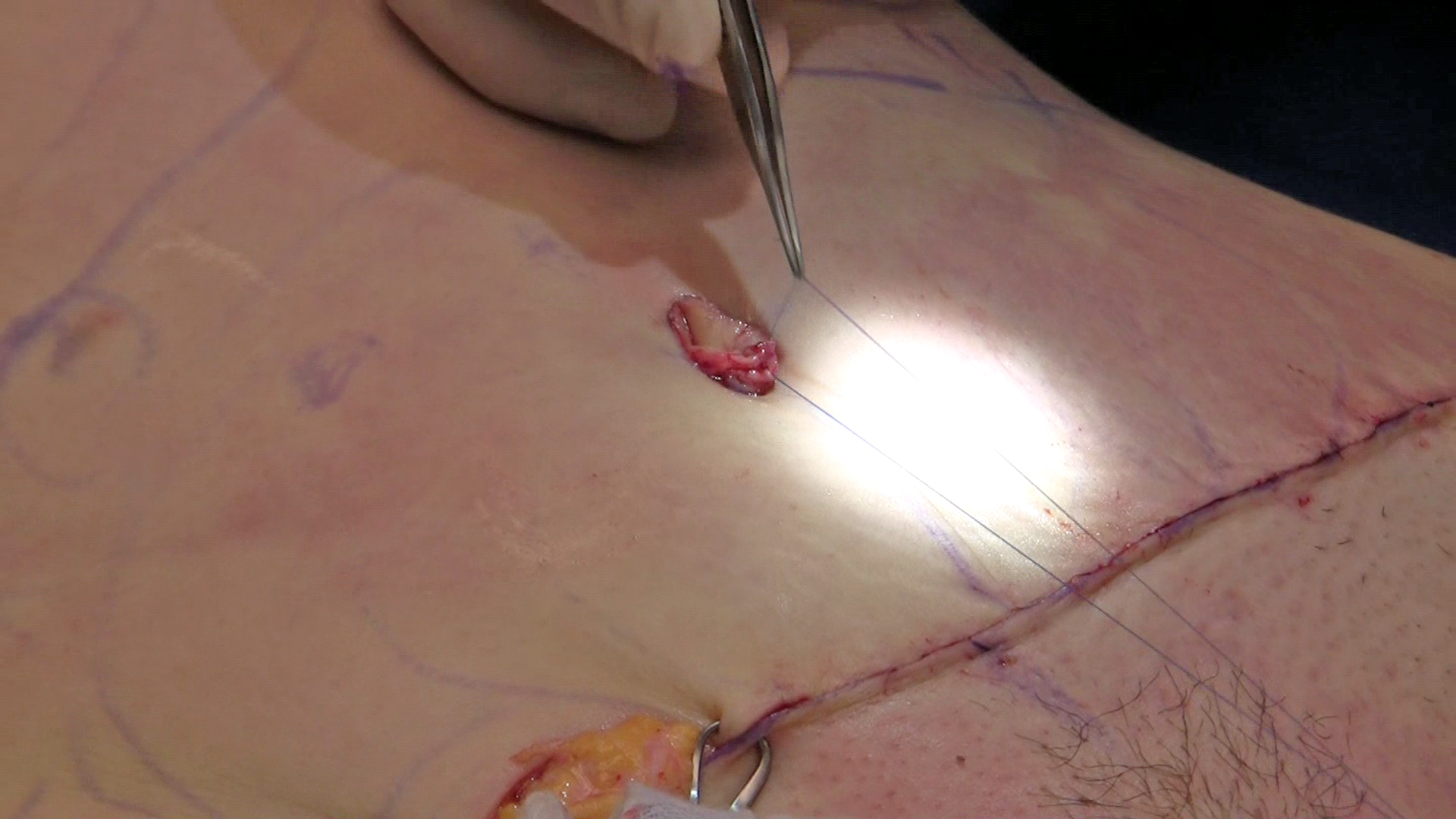
Reconstruction of the umbilicus (belly button) following an abdominoplasty surgery. The original umbilicus is sutured into a new hole created by the surgeon.

Abdominoplasty or "tummy tuck" is a cosmetic surgery procedure used to make the abdomen thinner and more firm. The surgery involves the removal of excess skin and fat from the middle and lower abdomen in order to tighten the muscle and fascia of the abdominal wall. This type of surgery is usually sought by patients with loose or sagging tissues, that develop after pregnancy or major weight loss.

== History ==
Modern abdominoplasties were developed starting in the 1960s. Heavier populations have led to increased demand for the surgeries, while technological advancements have improved their quality.

== Types of abdominoplasty surgery ==
Abdominoplasty procedures vary in extent and technique and may be classified according to the amount of tissue excision, abdominal wall repair, liposuction, and circumferential contouring performed. Contemporary studies describe multiple categories, including conventional abdominoplasty, mini-abdominoplasty, lipoabdominoplasty, circumferential abdominoplasty, and fleur-de-lis abdominoplasty.

The choice of technique depends on patient anatomy, skin excess, fat distribution, abdominal wall laxity, and whether contouring is limited to the anterior abdomen or extends around the trunk.

=== Complete abdominoplasty ===
In general, a complete or full abdominoplasty follows these steps:

1. An incision is made from hip to hip just above the pubic area.
2. Another incision is made to free the navel from the surrounding skin.
3. The skin is detached from the abdominal wall to reveal the muscles and fascia to be tightened. The muscle fascia wall is tightened with sutures.
4. Liposuction is often used to refine the transition zones of the abdominal sculpture.
5. A dressing and sometimes a compression garment are applied and any excess fluid from the site is drained.

=== Partial abdominoplasty ===
A partial or mini abdominoplasty proceeds as follows:

1. A smaller incision is made.
2. The skin and fat of the lower abdomen are detached in a more limited fashion from the muscle fascia. The skin is stretched down and excess skin removed.
3. Sometimes the belly button stalk is divided from the muscle below and the belly button slid down lower on the abdominal wall.
4. Sometimes a portion of the abdominal muscle fascia wall is tightened.
5. Liposuction is often used to contour the transition zone.
6. The flap is stitched back into place.

=== Extended abdominoplasty ===
An extended abdominoplasty expands upon the full abdominoplasty by addressing excess tissue of the flanks. The incision extends laterally, allowing improved contouring of the waist and adjacent regions.

=== High lateral tension tummy tuck ===
The high lateral tension abdominoplasty is a modification that incorporates lateral tension vectors in addition to vertical tightening. This technique improves waist definition and reduces reliance on midline tension.

=== Floating abdominoplasty or FAB technique ===
The floating abdominoplasty technique involves temporary detachment of the umbilicus to allow abdominal wall tightening through a limited incision. The umbilicus is subsequently reattached or repositioned.

=== Circumferential abdominoplasty ===
Circumferential abdominoplasty, also known as a belt lipectomy or lower body lift, involves removal of excess tissue around the trunk. It is commonly performed in patients following massive weight loss and allows contouring of the abdomen, flanks, and lower back.

=== Combination procedures ===
An abdominoplasty can be combined with liposuction to make a Lipotuck, which performs body contouring around the hips, thighs, and buttocks.

It can also be combined with liposuction contouring, breast reduction, breast lift, ribcage moulding procedures, or occasionally hysterectomy, depending on the reason for the hysterectomy. A popular name for multiple surgeries performed in the same surgical session including a cosmetic breast procedure with or without liposuction and an abdominoplasty is called a "mommy makeover".

== Risks ==
Abdominoplasty is generally considered a safe and effective procedure when performed by a qualified plastic surgeon. However, like all surgical procedures, it carries potential risks and complications. Studies have shown that the complication rate for abdominoplasty is higher than that of many other cosmetic surgeries due to the extent of tissue dissection, tension on the incision, and the size of the treatment area.

Possible complications include:

- Seroma formation (fluid accumulation beneath the skin), which is one of the most common complications following tummy tuck surgery.
- Hematoma, or bleeding beneath the skin that may require drainage or additional treatment.
- Infection, which can occur despite sterile surgical technique and postoperative antibiotics.
- Delayed wound healing or wound separation, particularly in areas of increased tension along the incision.
- Skin or fat necrosis, where reduced blood supply affects tissue healing and tissue survival.
- Scarring, including thickened or widened scars in some patients.
- Changes in skin sensation, including temporary numbness or hypersensitivity.
- Asymmetry or contour irregularities following healing.
- Blood clots, including deep vein thrombosis (DVT) or pulmonary embolism, which are rare but potentially serious surgical complications.
- Anesthesia-related complications, which may occur with any major surgical procedure.

Certain factors may increase the risk of complications, including smoking, obesity, diabetes, previous abdominal surgery, and combining procedures such as liposuction with abdominoplasty.

Careful patient selection, meticulous surgical technique, modern recovery protocols, and close postoperative monitoring all play an important role in reducing risk and supporting proper healing.

== Related procedures ==
Liposuction, also known as lipoplasty, is a type of surgery that removes fat from the human body in an attempt to change its shape.

Abdominoplasty is one type of body contouring, which is plastic surgery performed on different parts of the body with the aim of improving the shape and tone of the underlying tissue that supports fat.

Breast reduction, or reduction mammoplasty, is the cosmetic surgery used in resizing the breast, in women with oversized breasts and men with gynecomastia. This type of surgery is performed to treat a breast condition known as hypertrophy, which refers to oversized breasts. This condition usually occurs in both breasts and commonly develops at puberty or immediately after.

Breast lift, also referred to as mastopexy, is the surgical procedure that removes the excess skin and tightens the surrounding tissue of the breast, resulting in raising and firming the breast. Mastopexies carry a certain degree of risks as any other type of surgery does.

Ribcage moulding, surgically weakening or fracturing ribs followed by treatment with a corset whilst they heal, enables the waist to be restored following a widening of the lower part of the ribcage in response to weight gain or pregnancies.

Hysterectomies are sometimes performed with abdominoplasty. A hysterectomy consists in removing the uterus and it may be complete (when the body, fundus and cervix are removed) or partial (when only the uterine body is surgically removed). This procedure is normally performed by gynecologists and it is one of the most common gynecological surgeries. This type of surgery is used to treat adenomyosis, some benign tumors, and cancers of the ovaries, uterus, or cervix. Some trans men also choose to undergo a hysterectomy.

== Image gallery ==
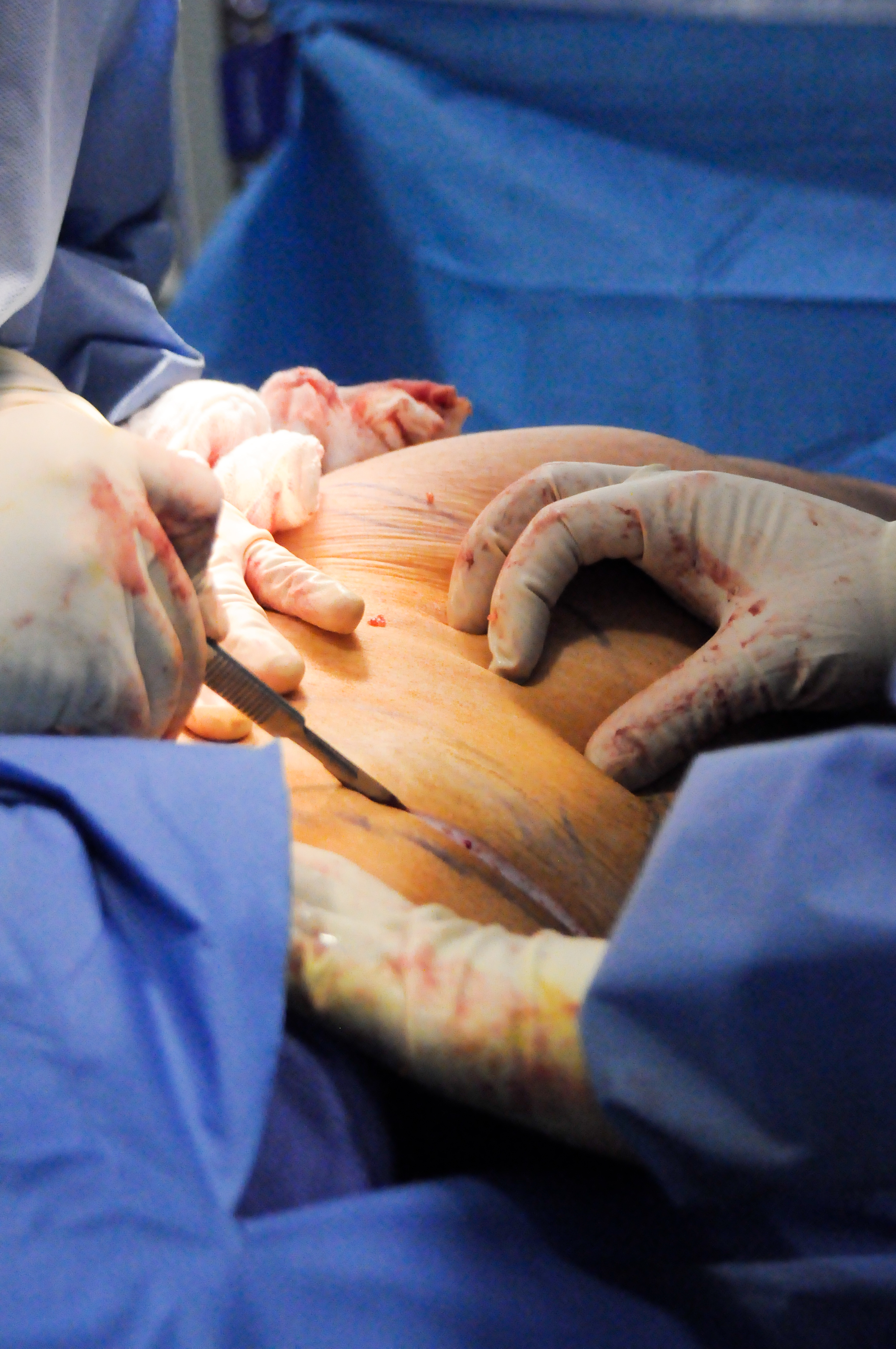
Making the initial incision across the lower abdomen. The incision is placed in the bikini line and runs from hip to hip.

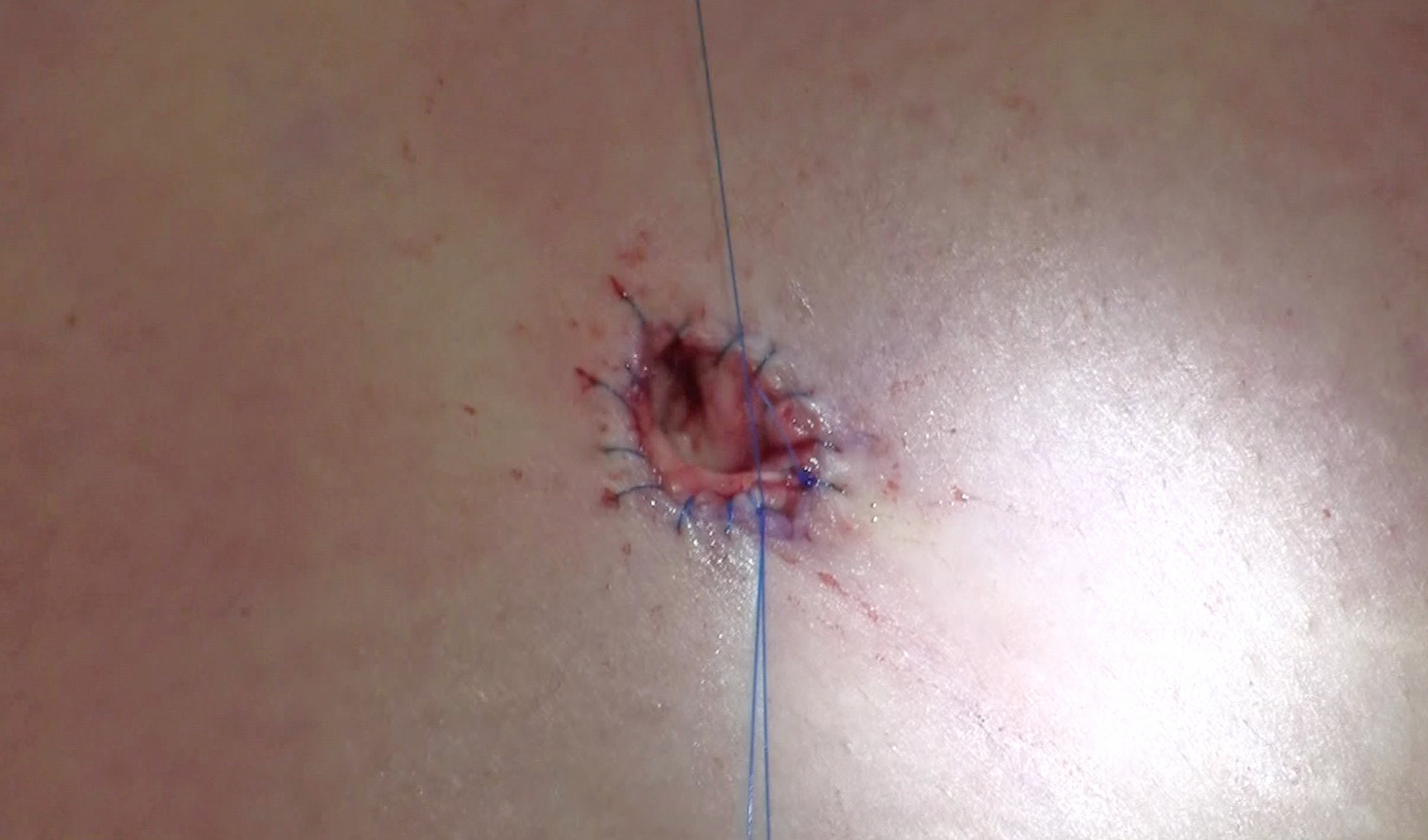
The final sutures securing the umbilicus (also known as "belly button") into its new position after an abdominoplasty

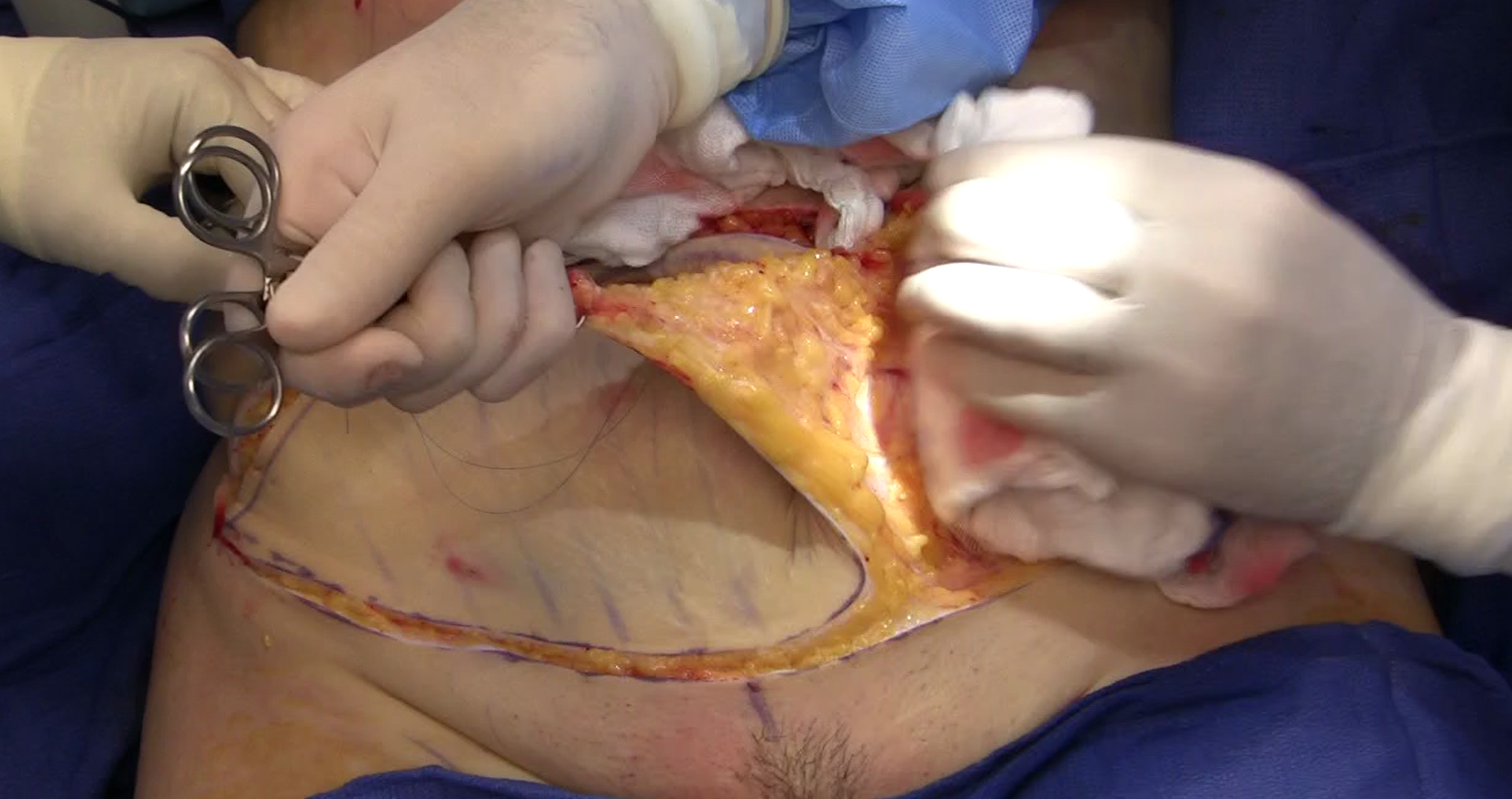
The removal of nearly 100 square centimeters of skin from the abdomen of a 40-year-old woman during an abdominoplasty surgery (also known as a "tummy tuck")

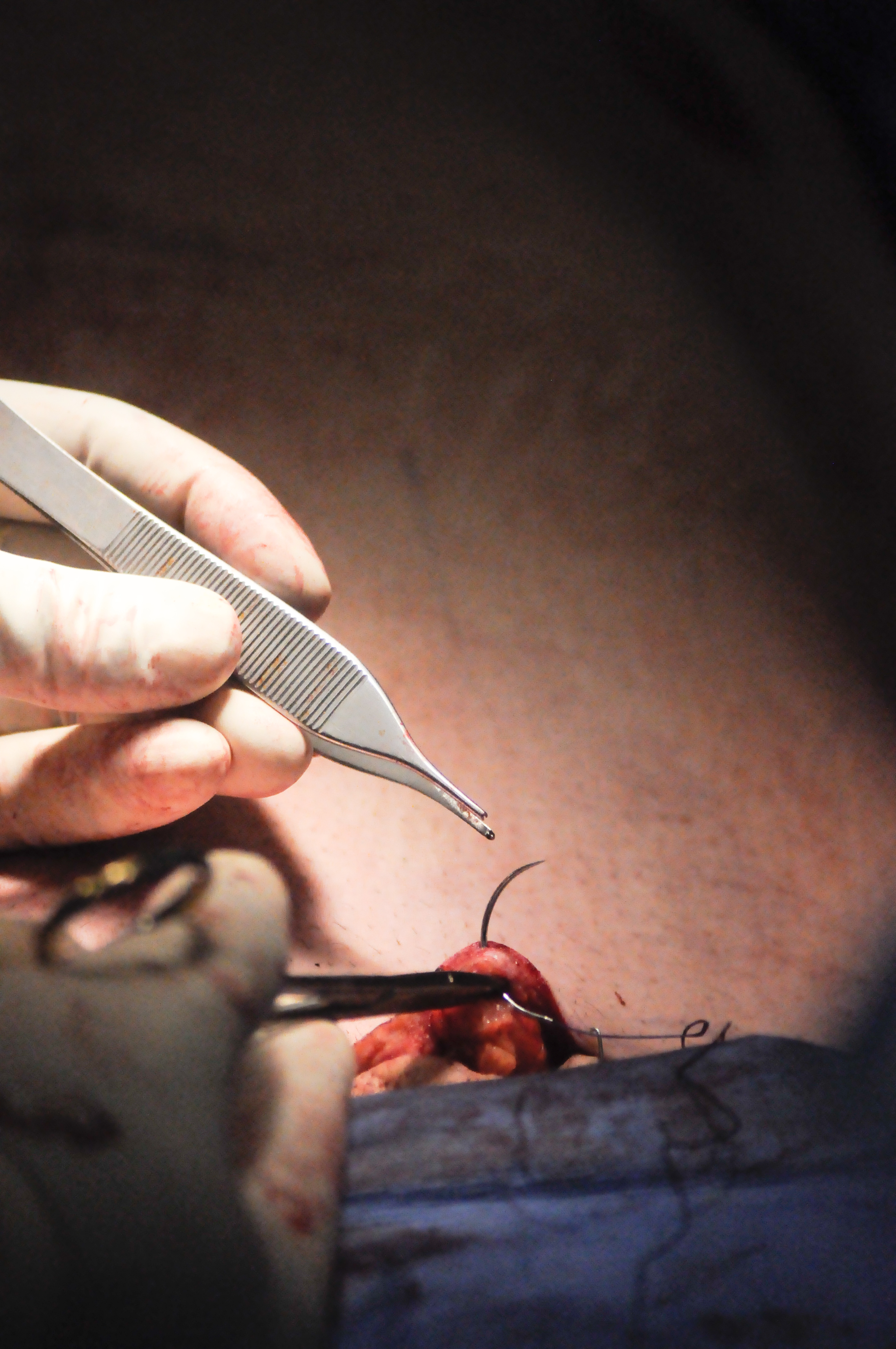
Placing the final sutures following an abdominoplasty procedure

== See also ==
- Abdominal etching
