= Jeffrey A. Klein =

American dermatologist

Jeffrey Alan Klein is an American dermatologist from Southern California, who described the tumescent technique for liposuction surgery in 1987, which according to Jayashree Venkataram "revolutionized liposuction surgery" by "permit[ting] liposuction totally by local anaesthesia and with minimal blood loss." He is the author of Tumescent Technique: Tumescent Anesthesia & Microcannular Liposuction, a textbook on liposuction safety and effectiveness.

== Education and training ==
Klein studied mathematics and physics as an undergraduate at the University of California, Riverside (BA in mathematics). As a graduate student, he studied mathematics at the Université de Paris and University of California, San Diego (MA in mathematics, 1971). He graduated from the School of Medicine, University of California, San Francisco in 1976 and spent eight additional years in advanced postgraduate training, with a master's degree in public health (biostatistics and epidemiology) from University of California, Berkeley; three years at University of California, Los Angeles as a resident in internal medicine (certification by the American Board of Internal Medicine, 1980; two years as a National Institute of Health research fellow in clinical pharmacology; and three years at University of California, Irvine as a resident in dermatology (certification by the American Board of Dermatology, 1984).

Klein is currently associate clinical professor of dermatology at University of California, Irvine College of Medicine and in private practice in San Juan Capistrano, California. He lives in Newport Beach, California.
