= Liposuction =

Surgery to remove unwanted fat

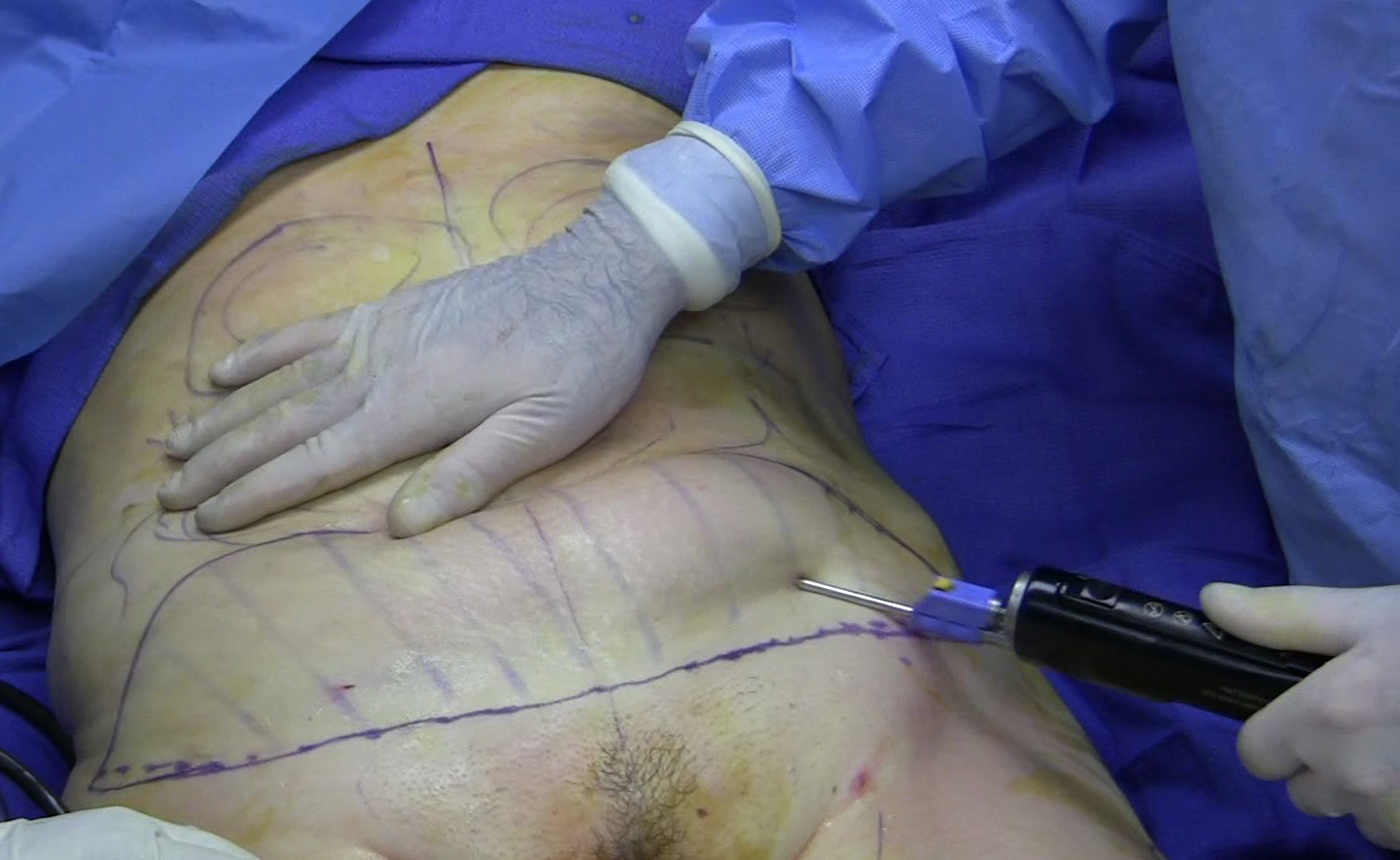
- A plastic surgeon performing liposuction surgery
- Other names: Lipoplasty, lipectomy, fat modeling, liposculpture, suction lipectomy, suction-assisted fat removal, lipo, lymph-sparing liposuction, tumescent liposuction, water-assisted liposuction, power-assisted liposuction, laser-assisted liposuction, ultra-sound assisted liposuction
- ICD-10-PCS: 0JDL3ZZ: RT UPPER LEG; 0JDM3ZZ: LT UPPER LEG; OJDN3ZZ: RT LOWER LEG; 0JDP3ZZ: LT LOWER LEG
- MeSH: DO65134
- MedlinePlus: 002985

Liposuction, or simply lipo, is a type of fat-removal procedure used in plastic surgery. Evidence does not support an effect on weight beyond a couple of months and does not appear to affect obesity-related problems.

The procedure may be performed under general, regional, or local anesthesia. It involves using a cannula and negative pressure to suck out fat. As a cosmetic procedure it is believed to work best on people with a normal weight and good skin elasticity.

While the suctioned fat cells are permanently gone, after a few months overall body fat generally returns to the same level as before treatment. This is despite maintaining the previous diet and exercise regimen. While the fat returns somewhat to the treated area, most of the increased fat occurs in the abdominal area. Visceral fat—the fat surrounding the internal organs—increases, and this condition has been linked to life-shortening diseases such as diabetes, stroke, and heart attack.

== Uses ==
There are two different uses for liposuction:

=== Cosmetic ===
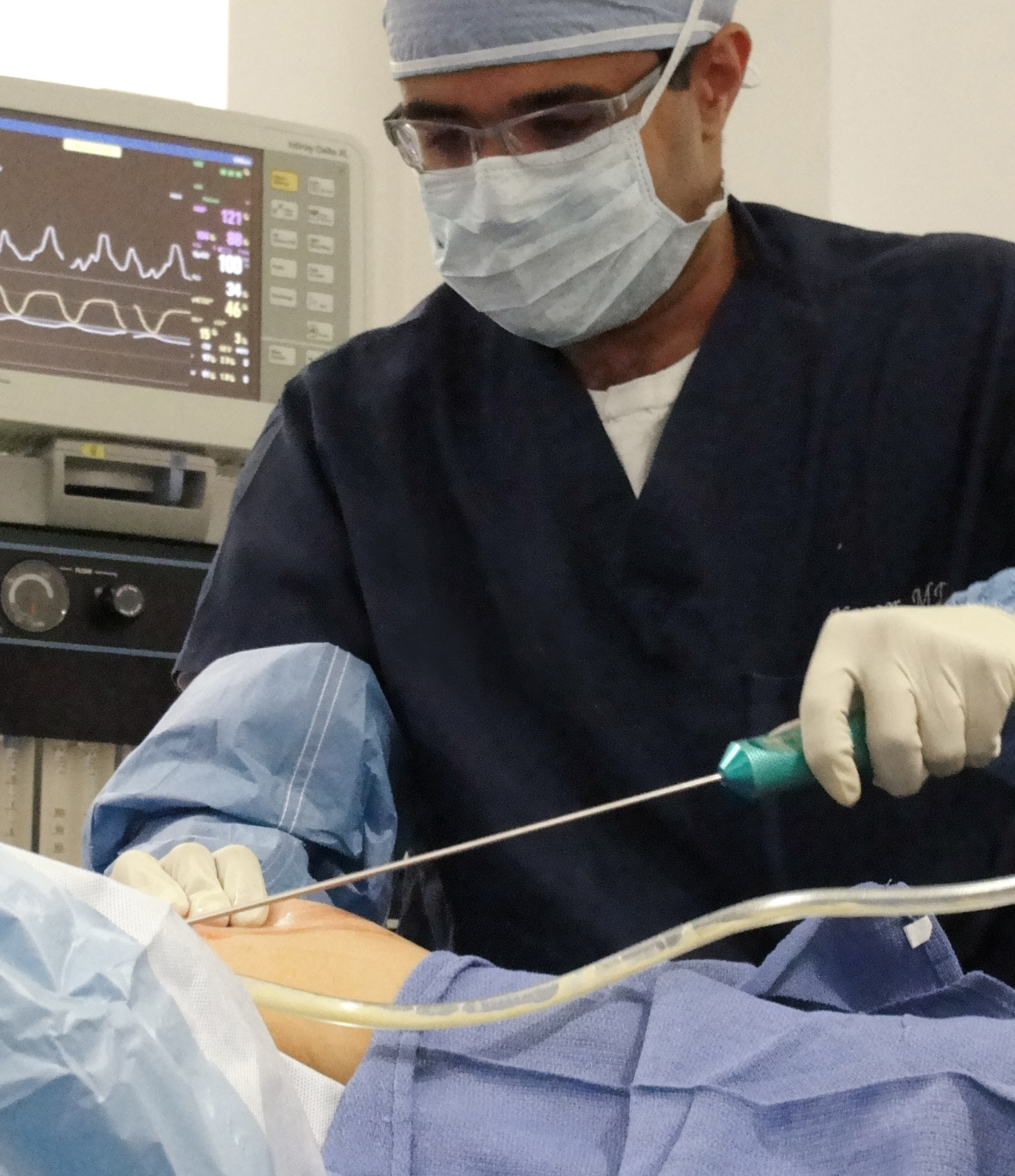
Doctor Performing Liposuction Surgery

Cosmetic liposuction is used to change the body's contour or shape, to aesthetically improve the appearance of body parts and contour. Studies show it is not effective for weight loss. Benefits from cosmetic liposuction appear to be of a short-term nature with little long-term effect. After a few months fat typically returns and redistributes. Liposuction does not help obesity-related metabolic disorders like insulin resistance.

=== Reconstructive, medically necessary ===
Reconstructive, medically necessary liposuction is used to treat lipedema, to remove excess fat in the chronic medical condition lymphedema, and to remove lipomas from areas of the body.

If the documentation supports the liposuction for a medical reason (lipedema, lymphedema, lipomas) as reconstructive, and not investigational, experimental, or unproven, the claim is medically necessary and should be reimbursed. While most insurance companies may initially deny the claim, many can be won upon appeal if the documentation and the patient's need supports the criteria for reconstructive surgery.

The techniques and terms listed below: tumescent, lymph-sparing, Tumescent Local Anesthesia (TLA), Water-Assisted Liposuction (WAL), Power-Assisted Liposuction (PAL), Laser-Assisted Liposuction (LAL) all apply to reconstructive, medically necessary liposuction.

== Techniques ==
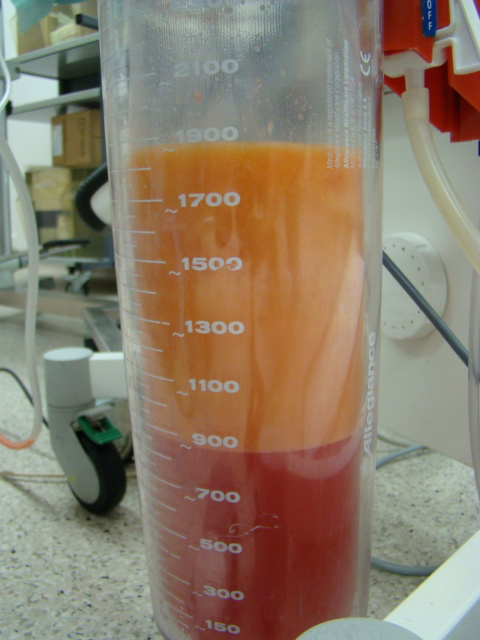
Liposuction aspirate

In general, fat is removed via a cannula (a hollow tube) and aspirator (a suction device). Liposuction techniques can be categorized by the amount of fluid injected, and by the mechanism by which the cannula works. If the removed fat is used as filler for the face, lips, or breasts, knowledge of the precise technique used to remove the fat is indicated. There are numerous types of liposuction. Some can be described as techniques or modalities. These techniques of liposuction are categorized depending upon the type of energy used for the liquifaction of fat. Often surgeons will use two or more of the different techniques below in the same session. Liposuction is frequently combined with other body contouring procedures to improve overall trunk proportions.

=== Abdominal etching ===
Abdominal etching is a cosmetic liposuction technique intended to accentuate the visible contours of the anterior abdominal wall, including the linea alba, linea semilunaris, and tendinous intersections of the rectus abdominis.

The technique was first described in 1993 and is generally discussed in the literature as part of high-definition liposculpture rather than as a weight-loss procedure.

=== Suction-assisted liposuction (SAL) ===
This is the most generic term for liposuction. In the CPT manual it is referred to as "suction-assisted lipectomy" and includes codes 15876–15879.

=== Micro-cannula ===
This does not address a particular technique but the diameter of the cannula, a stainless steel tube which is inserted into subcutaneous fat through a small opening or incision in the skin. The outside diameter of micro-cannulas range from 1 mm to 3 mm.

=== Lymph-sparing liposuction ===
This technique does not require a particular wand and is most often performed with either tumescent liposuction or WAL (below). It refers to the specific surgical technique, the skill of the surgeon, and the extensive training that is unique to removing lipedema fat. Because the scope is different for removal of lipedema fat versus cosmetic contouring, if lymph-sparing is not addressed in the surgical operative notes, a medical necessity review committee could determine that the procedure poses "a risk to the lymph system."

=== Tumescent local anesthesia (TLA)/tumescent liposuction ===
This may be referenced either way above, but the technique is the same. This is an anesthesia technique recommended for lymph-sparing liposuction surgery. Tumescent Liposuction refers to the use of anesthesia during liposuction. The word "tumescent" means swollen and firm. By injecting a large volume of very dilute lidocaine (local anesthetic) and epinephrine (capillary constrictor) into subcutaneous fat, the targeted tissue becomes swollen and firm, or tumescent. This technique does not require a special or specific type of wand.

=== Power-assisted liposuction (PAL) ===
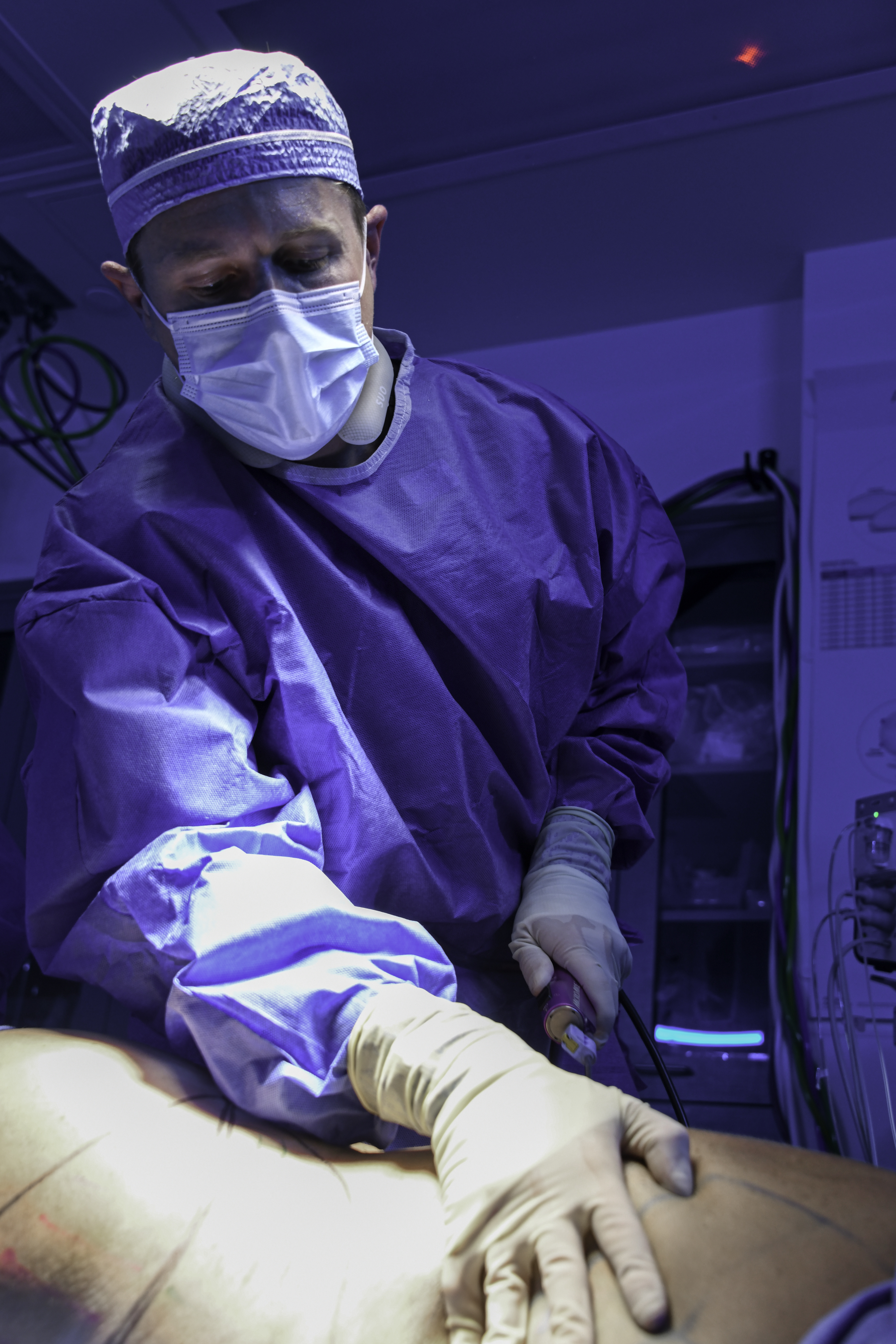
Intraoperative view of power-assisted liposuction (PAL) demonstrating use of a reciprocating cannula.

Referred to as "a vibrating cannula" in research studies, PAL uses a specific type of wand that creates an up and down, vibrating-like motion of the cannula to acquire greater fat removal. When compared to simple suction-assisted liposuction, PAL requires less energy for the surgeon to operate while also resulting in greater fat removal. It is commonly used for difficult, secondary, scarred areas, and when harvesting large volumes of fat for transfers to other areas.

Note that techniques can be combined; for instance one could refer to the procedure as "lymph-sparing, tumescent liposuction using a vibrating (PAL) microcannula to treat lipedema."

=== Water-jet assisted liposuction (WAL) ===
A specific technique and wand are commonly used for patients who require lymph-sparing liposuction for lipedema. The lipedema fat is removed using a fan-shaped jet of water, which includes the anesthetic. In contrast to tumescent liposuction above, where the anesthetic solution is injected separately and beforehand, the WAL wand both injects the solution and suctions the fat. BodyJet is a Water-Assisted Liposuction system.

=== Fibro-lympho-lipo-aspiration (FLLA) ===
This unique term for liposuction for lipedema is used in a specific paper by Campisi, Fibro-Lipo-Lymph-Aspiration With a Lymph Vessel Sparing Procedure to Treat Advanced Lymphedema After Multiple Lymphatic-Venous Anastomoses: The Complete Treatment Protocol. This term emphasizes the uniqueness of the reconstructive procedure versus the cosmetic procedure. Everything about the surgical suction application via cannula is different from standard suction lipectomy. The goal of FLLA is to relieve symptoms such as pain, ameliorate disability, improve function and quality of life, and halt disease progression.

Only small blunt cannulas are used, great care is used to not injure lymphatic which are already abnormal and increased risk of injury. Only the longitudinal orientation of cannulas is used at critical junctures. Preoperatively critical lymphatic structures are scanned and marked. FLLA surgery is significantly more time-consuming than cosmetic surgery often requiring 4–5 hours per body part; much larger aspirate volume is removed versus cosmetic suction lipectomy.

The benefit to lymphatics function comes not only from the removal of subcutaneous adipose tissue, but also the all components of the loose connective tissue including removing fibrosis in the interstitial space.

=== Ultrasound-assisted liposuction (UAL) ===
Ultrasound-assisted liposuction techniques used in the 1980s and 1990s were associated with cases of tissue damage, usually from excessive exposure to ultrasound energy. Third-generation UAL devices address this problem by using pulsed energy delivery and a specialized probe that allows physicians to safely remove excess fat. UAL is beneficial in people with a particular skin tone, in liposuction of areas that are more difficult to remove fat, that include treatment of gynecomastia, or areas where secondary liposuction is being performed.

=== Laser-assisted liposuction/lipolysis (LAL) ===
Referred to as Smart Lipo, this technique uses laser technology to coagulate and tighten the skin and boost collagen performance. Uses include "cankles", debulking surgery for elephantiasis nostras and lipedema.

=== Radiofrequency-assisted liposuction ===
Radiofrequency-assisted Liposuction, also known as RFAL, is a new procedure that is being done by thermal energy to promote skin tightening and remove unwanted fat. In this technique, radio waves of specific frequency are used to melt fat.

=== After care—sutures ===
Doctors disagree on the issues of scarring with not suturing versus resolution of the swelling allowed by leaving the wounds open to drain fluid. Suturing is more common with a large cannula. Since the incisions are small, and the amount of fluid that must drain out is large, some surgeons opt to leave the incisions open, while others suture them only partially, leaving space for the fluid to drain out.

== Safety and risks ==
Liposuction is considered very safe, though not all liposuction surgery is equal. Small volume liposuction (<1,000 cc) done awake is different from large volume liposuction (>5,000 cc, in some cases 10,000 cc) done with anesthesia and a hospital stay.

Suction-assisted lipectomy (aka liposuction) were identified from the Tracking Operations and Outcomes for Plastic Surgeons database maintained by the American Society of Plastic Surgeons (ASPS). The ASPS maintains a registry of plastic surgery cases called TOPS (Tracking Operations & Outcomes for Plastic Surgeons) which is the largest database of plastic surgery cases. The TOPS database is only voluntary, not available to the public, and does not follow cases long-term or get testimony and experience of patients, only from doctors who profit from doing liposuction. Based on this database, no deaths were found in about 4,500 cases done by plastic surgeons 2009–10. However, non-plastic surgeons are not included in this.

In a 2015 study, 69 of 4,534 patients (1.5 percent) meeting inclusion criteria experienced a postoperative complication. Their conclusion was that: Liposuction by board-certified plastic surgeons is safe, with a low risk of life-threatening complications. Traditional liposuction volume thresholds do not accurately convey individualized risk. The authors' risk assessment model showed that volumes above 100 ml per unit of body mass index confer an increased risk of complications. An example is the case of Aarthi Agarwal, a Bollywood actress who died six weeks after liposuction surgery after going into cardiac arrest.

A spectrum of complications may occur due to any liposuction. Risk is increased when treated areas cover a greater percentage of the body, incisions are numerous, a large amount of tissue is removed, and concurrent surgeries are done at the same time. To address safety issues, in 2009 the American Society of Plastic Surgeons (ASPS) published Evidence-Based Patient Safety Advisory: Liposuction. This 17-page document addresses key safety issues and offers recommendations. In addition, the increase in tumescent and lymph-sparing techniques have had a positive impact on diminishing complications. In a 2009 paper, the author found from a series of 3,240 procedures, no deaths occurred, and no complications requiring hospitalization were experienced. In nine cases, complications developed that needed further action. The conclusion was that liposuction using exclusively Tumescent Local Anesthesia (TLA) is a proven safe procedure provided that the existing guidelines are meticulously followed.

Serious complications include deep vein thrombosis, organ perforation, bleeding, and infection. As of 2011, deaths were reported to occur in about one per ten thousand cases.

=== Medical tourism ===
To obtain liposuction at lower cost or at a shorter wait may encourage medical tourism. The Dominican Republic has been a popular destination for US medical tourists, because it is fairly close. Since 2003, the CDC has reported adverse events after cosmetic surgery, particularly due to liposuction in combination with gluteal fat transfer, abdominoplasty, and breast augmentation. During 2009–2022, 93 U.S. citizens died after cosmetic surgery in the Dominican Republic, and 90% of autopsy-confirmed deaths were due to embolism; in 55% due to fat embolism and in 35% due to pulmonary venous thromboembolism.

=== Side effects ===
- Pain, which may be temporary or chronic
- Post-liposuction fat redistribution or post liposuction weight gain
- Bruising
- Infections
- Embolisms may occur when loosened fat enters the blood through blood vessels ruptured during liposuction. Pieces of fat can wind up in the lungs, or even the brain. Fat emboli may cause permanent disability or, in some cases, be fatal.
- Puncture wounds in the organs (visceral perforations) may require surgery for repair. They can also prove fatal.
- Seroma is a pooling of serum, the straw-colored liquid from blood, in areas where tissue has been removed. "Seromas, which are pockets of clear fluid, may form under the skin after liposuction.
- Paresthesias (changes in sensation that may be caused by nerve compression) is an altered sensation at the site of the liposuction. This may either be in the form of an increased sensitivity (pain), or numbness in the area. In some cases, these changes in sensation may be permanent, although typical patients recover over the span of several weeks.
- Swelling, in some cases, may persist for weeks or months after liposuction.
- Skin necrosis occurs when the skin above the liposuction site changes color and falls off. Large areas of skin necrosis may become infected with bacteria or microorganisms.
- Burns can occur during ultrasound-assisted liposuction if the ultrasound probe becomes hot.
- Fluid imbalance may impact the patient after returning home. The condition can result in serious ailments such as heart problems, excess fluid collecting in the lungs, or kidney problems.
- Toxicity from anesthesia due to the use of lidocaine, a skin-numbing drug, can cause lightheadedness, restlessness, drowsiness, a ringing in the ears, slurred speech, a metallic taste in the mouth, numbness of the lips and tongue, shivering, muscle twitching and convulsions. Lidocaine usage has already been linked to deaths from liposuction.
- Scars at the site of the incision are usually small and fade with time, although some may be larger or more prominent.
- Deformities in the shape of the body may occur at the liposuction site after the procedure for about 20% of patients.
- Death

== History ==
Relatively modern techniques for body contouring and removal of fat were first performed by a French surgeon, Charles Dujarier, but a 1926 case that resulted in the amputation of the leg of a French dancer due to excessive tissue removal and too-tight suturing set back interest in body contouring for decades.

Liposuction evolved from work in the late 1960s from surgeons in Europe using techniques to cut away fat, which were limited to regions without many blood vessels due to the amount of bleeding the technique caused.

In the mid-1970s in Rome, Arpad Fischer and his son Giorgio Fischer created the technique of using a blunt cannula linked to suction; they used it only to remove fat on the outer thighs. In 1977, Arpad Fischer and Giorgio Fischer reviewed 245 cases with the planotome instrument for treating cellulite in the lateral trochanteric (hip-thigh) areas. There was a 4.9 per cent incidence of seromas, despite incision-wound suction catheters and compression dressings; 2 per cent of the cases developed pseudocysts that required removal of the capsule (cyst) through a wider incision (>5 mm (0.20 in)) and the use of the panotome. The Fischers called their procedure liposculpture.

Yves-Gérard Illouz and Fournier extended the Fischers' work to the whole body, which they were able to use by using different sized cannulae. Illouz later developed the "wet" technique in which the fat tissue was injected with saline and hyaluronidase, which helped dissolve tissue holding the fat, prior to suctioning. Lidocaine was also added as a local anesthetic. Fournier also advocated using compression after the operation, and travelled and lectured to spread the technique. The Europeans had performed the procedures under general anesthesia; in the 1980s, American dermatologists pioneered techniques allowing only local anesthetics to be used; Jeffrey A. Klein published a method that became known as "tumescent" in which a large volume of very dilute lidocaine, along with epinephrine to help control bleeding via vasoconstriction, and sodium bicarbonate as a buffering agent.

In 2015, liposuction surpassed breast augmentation surgery as the most commonly performed cosmetic procedure in the US.

== See also ==
- Bariatrics – branch of medicine that deals with the causes, prevention, and treatment of obesity
- Gastric bypass surgery
- Lipotomy
- Spot reduction
- Death of Catherine Cando – Ecuadorian case involving liposuction complications
