= Mastopexy =

Mammoplasty procedure to raise sagging breasts

- Specialty: Plastic surgeon

Mastopexy (Greek μαστός mastos "breast" + -pēxiā "affix") is the plastic surgery mammoplasty procedure for raising sagging breasts upon the chest of the woman, by changing and modifying the size, contour, and elevation of the breasts. In a breast-lift surgery to re-establish an aesthetically proportionate bust for the woman, the critical corrective consideration is the tissue viability of the nipple-areola complex (NAC), to ensure the functional sensitivity of the breasts for lactation and breast-feeding.

The breast-lift correction of a sagging bust is a surgical operation that cuts and removes excess tissues (glandular, adipose, skin), overstretched suspensory ligaments, excess skin from the skin-envelope, and transposes the nipple-areola complex higher upon the breast hemisphere. In surgical practice, mastopexy can be performed as a discrete breast-lift procedure, and as a subordinate surgery within a combined mastopexy–breast augmentation procedure.

Moreover, mastopexy surgery techniques also are applied to reduction mammoplasty, which is the correction of oversized breasts. Psychologically, a mastopexy procedure to correct breast ptosis is not indicated by medical cause or physical reason, but by the self-image of the woman; that is, the combination of physical, aesthetic, and mental health requirements of her self.

== The patient ==
The usual mastopexy patient is the woman who desires the restoration of her bust (elevation, size, and contour), because of the post-partum volume losses of fat and milk-gland tissues, and the occurrence of breast ptosis. The clinical indications presented by the woman—the degrees of laxness of the suspensory Cooper's ligaments; and of the breast skin-envelope (mild, moderate, severe, and pseudo ptosis)—determine the applicable restorative surgical approach for lifting the breasts. Grade I (mild) breast ptosis can be corrected solely with breast augmentation, surgical and non-surgical. Severe breast ptosis can be corrected with breast-lift techniques, such as the Anchor pattern, the Inverted-T incision, and the Lollipop pattern, which are performed with circumvertical and horizontal surgical incisions; which produce a periareolar scar, at the periphery (edge) of the nipple-areola complex (NAC), and a vertical scar, descending from the lower margin of the NAC to the horizontal scar in the infra-mammary fold (IMF), where the breast meets the chest; such surgical scars are the aesthetic disadvantages of mastopexy.

== Breast ptosis ==
Etiology

Gravity is the most common cause of breast ptosis, or sagging.

- In a young woman with large breasts the sagging occurs because the volume and weight of the bust is disproportionate to body type, and because of the great elasticity of the thin, young skin envelope of each breast.
- In middle-aged women, breast ptosis usually is caused by postpartum hormonal changes to the maternal body (e.g., depleted adipose fat tissue and atrophied milk glands) and because of the inelasticity of the skin envelope, which is overstretched by engorgement during lactation.
- In post-menopausal women, in addition to gravity, breast ptosis atrophy is aggravated by the inelasticity of overstretched, aged skin.

Pathophysiology and presentation

In the course of a woman's life, her breasts change in size and volume as the skin envelope becomes inelastic, and the Cooper's suspensory ligaments—which suspend the mammary gland high against the chest—become loose, and so cause the falling forward and the sagging of the breast and the nipple-areola complex (NAC). Moreover, additional to tissue prolapse, postpartum diminishment (involution) of the voluminous milk glands in the breast aggravates the looseness of the suspensory ligaments, and of the inelastic, overstretched skin envelope. Mastopexy corrects said degenerative physical changes, by elevating the (internal) parenchymal tissues, cutting and re-sizing the skin envelope, and transposing the nipple-areola complex higher upon the breast hemisphere. The degree of breast ptosis of each breast is determined by the position of the nipple-areola complex (NAC) upon the breast hemisphere; ptosis of the breast is measured with the modified Regnault ptosis grade scale.

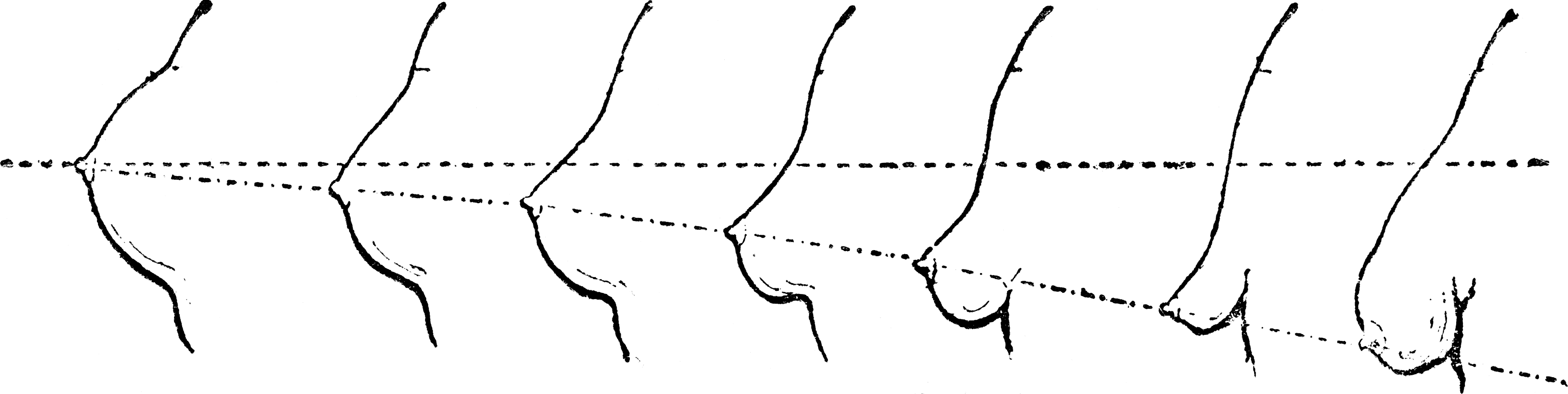
Breast ptosis, the progressive prolapsation (falling forward) of the breast.

The Regnault ptosis grade scale

- Grade I: Mild ptosis — The nipple is located below the inframammary fold (IMF), but remains located above the lower pole of the breast.
- Grade II: Moderate ptosis — The nipple is located below the IMF; yet some lower-pole breast tissue hangs lower than the nipple.
- Grade III: Advanced ptosis — The nipple is located below the IMF, and is at the maximum projection of the breast from the chest.
- Grade IV: Severe ptosis — The nipple is far below the inframammary fold, and there is no lower-pole breast tissue below the nipple.

Laurence Anthony Kirwan published an alternative classification system for ptosis of the primary or non augmented breast that is meant to be better suited than the Regnault scale for planning surgery.

Additional mastopexy considerations

Pseudoptosis — The indication is the sagging of the skin of the lower half (inferior pole) of the breast, featuring the nipple located either at or above the inframammary fold (IMF); as such, pseudoptosis is a usual consequence of postpartum milk-gland atrophy. The nipple is located either at or above the IMF, while the lower half of the breast sags below the IMF. Pseudoptosis usually occurs when the woman ceases nursing, because the milk glands have atrophied, and so reduced the volume of the breast, thus the sagging of the breast-envelope skin.

Parenchymal maldistribution — The lower breast lacks fullness, the inframammary fold is very high under the breast hemisphere, and the nipple-areola complex is close to the IMF. Such indications of the maldistribution of parenchymal tissues indicate a developmental deformity.

== Surgical anatomy of the breast ==
=== Composition ===
Surgically, the breast is a milk-producing apocrine gland overlaying the chest; and is attached at the nipple, and suspended with ligaments from the chest; and which is integral to the skin, the body integument of the woman. The dimensions and the weight of the breasts vary with the woman's age and her habitus (body build and physical constitution). Hence, small-to-medium-sized breasts weigh approximately 500 gm or less, and large breasts weigh approximately 750–1,000 gm. Anatomically, the breast topography and the locale of the nipple-areola complex (NAC) on the breast hemisphere are particular to each woman; thus, the statistically desirable (mean average) measurements are a 21–23 cm sternal distance (nipple to sternum-bone notch), and a 5–7 cm inferior-limb distance, from the nipple to the inframammary fold, where the breast joins the chest.

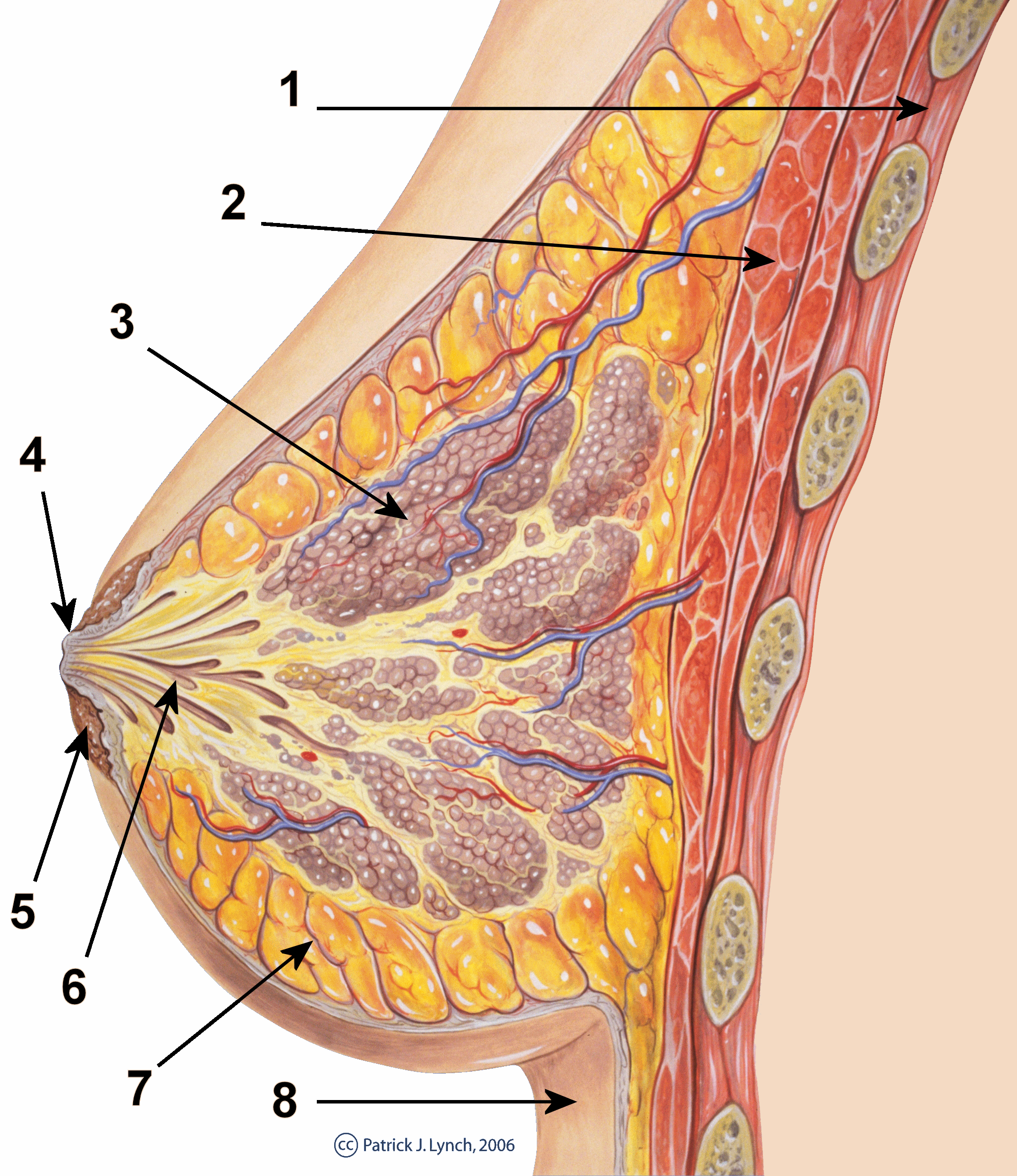
The surgical anatomy of the mammary gland: 1. Chest wall; 2. Pectoralis muscles; 3. Lobules; 4. Nipple; 5. Areola; 6. Milk duct; 7. Fatty tissue; 8. Skin envelope

=== Blood supply and innervation ===
The arterial blood supply of the breast has medial and lateral vascular components; it is supplied with blood by the internal mammary artery (from the medial aspect), the lateral thoracic artery (from the lateral aspect), and the 3rd, 4th, 5th, 6th, and 7th intercostal perforating arteries. Drainage of venous blood from the breast is by the superficial vein system under the dermis, and by the deep vein system parallel to the artery system. The primary lymph drainage system is the retromammary lymph plexus in the pectoral fascia. Sensation in the breast is established by the peripheral nervous system innervation of the anterior and lateral cutaneous branches of the 4th, 5th, and 6th intercostal nerves, and thoracic spinal nerve 4 (T4 nerve) innervates and supplies sensation to the nipple-areola complex.

=== Mechanical structures of the breast ===
In realizing the breast lift, the mastopexic correction takes anatomic and histologic account of the biomechanical, load-bearing properties of the three tissue types (glandular, adipose, skin) that compose and support the breast; among the properties of the soft tissues of the breast is near-incompressibility (Poisson's ratio of ~0.5).

1. Rib cage. The 2nd, 3rd, 4th, 5th, and 6th ribs of the thoracic cage are the structural supports for the mammary glands.
2. Chest muscles. The breasts lie upon the pectoralis major muscle, the pectoralis minor muscle, and the intercostal muscles (between the ribs), and can extend to and cover a portion of the (front) anterior serratus muscle (attached to the ribs, the rib muscles, and the shoulder blade), and to the rectus abdominis muscle (a long, flat muscle extending up the torso, from pubic bone to rib cage). The body posture of the woman exerts physical stresses upon the pectoralis major muscles and the pectoralis minor muscles, which cause the weight of the breasts to induce static and dynamic shear forces (when standing and when walking), compression forces (when lying supine), and tension forces (when kneeling on four limbs).
3. Pectoralis fascia. The pectoralis major muscle is covered with a thin superficial membrane, the pectoral fascia, which has many prolongations intercalated among its fasciculi (fascicles); at the midline, it is attached to the front of the sternum, above it is attached to the clavicle (collar bone), while laterally and below, it is continuous with the fascia.
4. Suspensory ligaments. The subcutaneous layer of adipose tissue in the breast is traversed with thin suspensory ligaments (Cooper's ligaments) that extend obliquely to the skin surface, and from the skin to the deep pectoral fascia. The structural stability provided by the Cooper's ligaments derives from its closely packed bundles of collagen fibers oriented in parallel; the principal, ligament-component cell is the fibroblast, interspersed throughout the parallel collagen-fiber bundles of the shoulder, axilla, and thorax ligaments.
5. Glandular tissue. As a mammary gland, the breast comprises lobules (milk glands at each lobe-tip) and the lactiferous ducts (milk passages), which widen to form an ampulla (sac) at the nipple.
6. Adipose tissue. The fat tissue of the breast is composed of lipidic fluid (60–85% weight) that is 90–99 per cent triglycerides, free fatty acids, diglycerides, cholesterol phospholipids, and minute quantities of cholesterol esters, and monoglycerides; the other components are water (5–30% weight) and protein (2–3% weight).
7. The skin envelope. The breast skin is in three layers: (i) the epidermis, (ii) the dermis, and (iii) the hypodermis. The epidermis is 50–100 μm thick, and is composed of a stratum corneum of flat keratin cells, that is 10–20 μm thick; it protects the underlying viable epidermis, which is composed of keratinizing epithelial cells. The dermis is mostly collagen and elastin fibers embedded to a viscous water and glycoprotein medium. The fibers of the upper dermis ("papillary dermis") are thinner than the fibers of the deep dermis, thus the skin envelope is 1–3 mm thick. The thickness of the hypodermis (adipocyte cells) varies from woman to woman, and body part.

== Surgical procedures ==
Indications

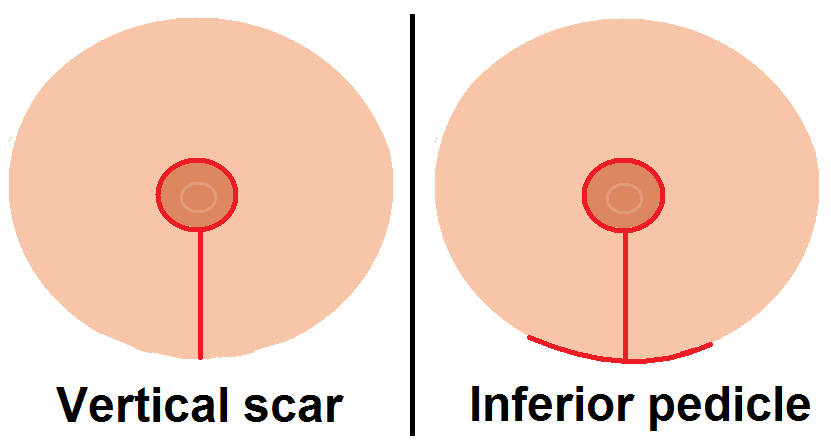
Mastopexy corrections: Lollipop incision (vertical scar) and Anchor incision (inferior pedicle) breast-lift procedures; these incision plans also are applied to reduction mammoplasty.

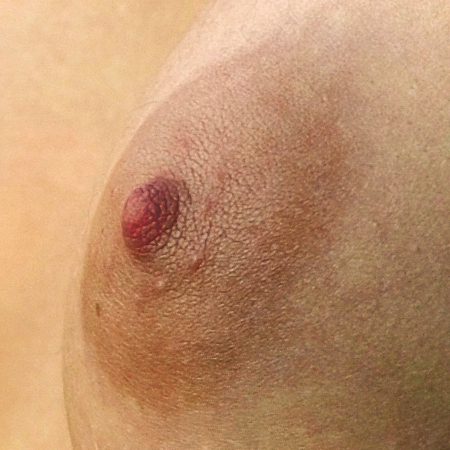
Mastopexy: foremost is the tissue viability of the nipple-areola complex; it also hides a periareolar scar in the skin-color transition at the areolar periphery.

The surgeon–physician evaluates the woman requesting a breast-lift operation to confirm that she understands the health risks and benefits of the mastopexy procedure. The surgeon confirms that her ideal body image (aesthetic goal) corresponds to what can realistically be achieved with the plastic surgery options available. The following conditions are indications for mastopexy.

- Sagging breasts, which prolapsed (fell forward) consequent to postpartum milk gland diminishment, menopause, gross weight-loss, et cetera.
- Post-explantation ptosis, the sagging of the inelastic skin envelopes, once emptied of the breast implants.
- Congenital ptosis and pseudoptosis, as observed in conditions such as tuberous breast deformity (constricted breast).
- Acquired or relative ptosis, as seen in the post-mastectomy breast reconstruction of a bust that is of natural and proportionate size, look, and feel.

=== Mastopexy of the sagging breast ===
The following descriptions of the full breast-lift and of the modified breast-lift techniques are limited to the surgical incisions used to address the skin envelope of the breast, not the internal parenchyma, the substance of the breast.

Full breast lift

The sagging bust is lifted using the circumvertical- and horizontal-incision plan of the Anchor mastopexy (also Lexer pattern, inverted-T incision, Wise pattern, inferior pedicle), which features three incisions:

- The Anchor ring: a circular incision at the upper-edge of the periphery of the nipple-areola complex.
- The Anchor shank: a vertical incision from the lower edge of the nipple-areola complex to the inframammary-fold incision.
- The Anchor stock: a horizontal incision along the inframammary fold, where the breast joins the chest.

In cutting the folds of excess skin from the sagging, inelastic skin-envelope of the breast (and occasionally reducing the nipple-areola complex diameter), the three-incision technique of the Anchor mastopexy allows maximal corrections to the breasts, thereby producing an elevated bust with breasts of natural size, look, and feel. Moreover, each of the three scars to the breast hemisphere produced by the Anchor-pattern mastopexy has a characteristic healing pattern:

- at the periareolar area — the edge of the nipple-areola complex — the surgical scar is concealed by the light-to-dark skin color at the pigment transition, where the light-color breast skin becomes the dark-color areola skin (the ring of the Anchor pattern)
- the medial vertical scar (the shank of the Anchor pattern) extends from the lower edge of the nipple-areola complex to the inframammary fold; the shadow of the breast hemisphere hides it
- the horizontal scar (the stock of the Anchor pattern), which follows, and is hidden in, the inframammary fold.

Post-surgically, of the three breast-lift surgery scars, the scar to the inframammary fold exhibits the greatest tendency to hypertrophy, to thickness and large size. Although the coloration of mastopexy scars fades with the full maturation of the tissues, they do remain visible.

Modified breast lift

The incision plans of the techniques for modified breast lift feature fewer cuts and fewer scars, but limit the plastic surgeon by allowing fewer changes to the skin envelope of the breast. In surgical praxis, the modified breast lift often is a sub-ordinate surgery within a mastopexy–breast augmentation procedure, the simultaneous lifting and enlarging the bust. Moreover, these incisions are applied to correct the ptosis discussed above; some technical variants of the modified breast lift are:

1. the periareolar lift (crescent lift), featuring a crescent-shaped incision, above and at a variable portion of the nipple-areola complex perimeter, allows the cutting and removal of a crescent of flesh, thereby facilitates the elevation (transposition) of the nipple-areola complex to its higher (new) locale upon the breast hemisphere.
2. the circumareolar lift (Benelli breast lift, donut lift), featuring the cutting out of a concentric ring of flesh from around the nipple-areola complex, limits the size and diameter of the circular scar. Typically, a permanent deep suture is used to prevent areola scar widening.
3. the circumvertical lift (lollipop lift, vertical scar), featuring a circumareolar incision, around the circumference of the nipple-areola complex, and a vertical incision from the lower edge of the nipple-areola complex periphery to the inframammary fold.

=== Mastopexy of the augmented breast ===
Women who have undergone breast augmentation also are susceptible to breast ptosis; which incidence might be induced by the physical and mechanical stresses exerted by the breast implants upon the internal tissues and the skin envelope; such overstretching thins the skin and atrophies its elastic qualities. Statistically, breast augmentation and mastopexy are plastic surgery operations with low incidence rates of medical complications; yet, when performed as a combined breast-repair procedure (mastopexy–augmentation), the physiologic stresses upon the health of the woman increase the risks of incision-wound infection, breast-implant exposure, damage to the breast and nipple nerves leading to sensation changes, malposition of the nipple-areola complex, and malposition of the breast implant in the implant pocket. Therefore, a mastopexy–augmentation procedure features increased surgical complication rates, when compared to the lesser complication rates of breast augmentation and mastopexy as discrete surgical operations; likewise, the individual incidence rates of surgical revision and complications, when compared to the revision and complication rates for the combined mastopexy–augmentation procedure. Recent studies of a newer technique for simultaneous augmentation mastopexy (SAM) indicate that it is a safe surgical procedure with minimal medical complications. The SAM technique involves invaginating and tacking the tissues first, in order to previsualize the result, before making any surgical incisions to the breast.

=== Contraindications ===
The contraindications for mastopexy are few: aspirin use, tobacco smoking, diabetes, and obesity are medical and health conditions associated with increased incidences of nipple necrosis. In resolving the perceived ptosis of a woman with encapsulated breast implants, the surgeon determines her suitability for a breast lift procedure after explantation, which facilitates assessment of the true degree of ptosis present in the explanted breasts; likewise the assessment of the effects of a combined breast-lift and revision-augmentation procedure, featuring the removal and the replacement of breast implants. For the woman who is at high risk for developing breast cancer (primary or recurrent), the mastopexy might alter the histologic architecture of the breasts, which tissue change might interfere with the accurate MRI detection and subsequent treatment of cancer; the risks and benefits will be discussed in that setting.

== Surgical techniques ==
=== General ===
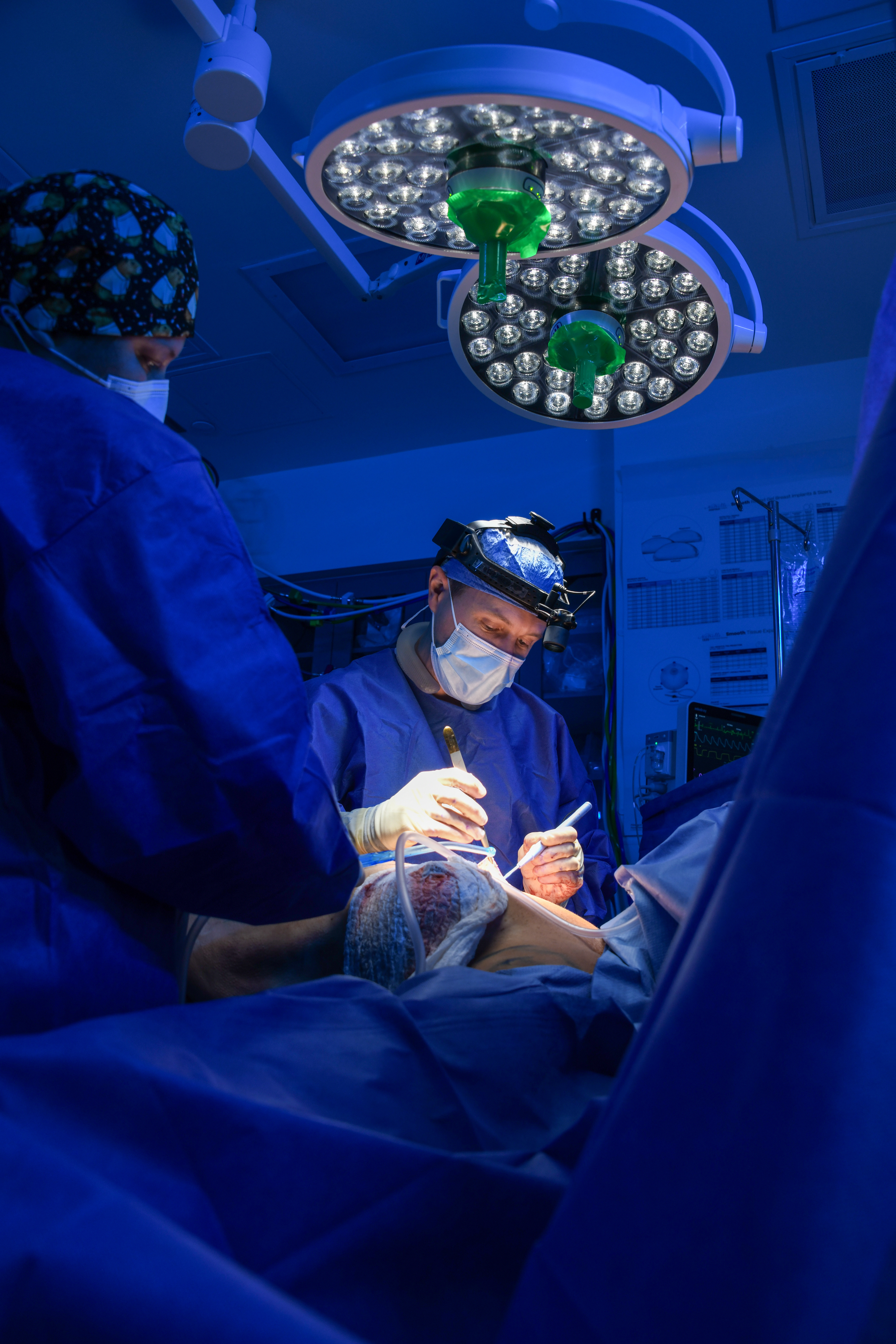
Modern breast lift surgery performed using sterile operative technique and advanced surgical lighting in the operating room.

Modern breast lift surgery is performed using sterile operative technique and individualized surgical planning designed to restore breast shape, nipple position, and overall breast balance while preserving tissue viability and sensation.

Breast lift techniques are selected based on the degree of breast ptosis, skin laxity, breast volume, tissue quality, and the position of the nipple-areola complex relative to the inframammary fold. Mild ptosis may sometimes be corrected with more limited incision patterns, while moderate to severe ptosis often requires more extensive skin reshaping and structural support techniques to achieve durable elevation and contour improvement.

Contemporary mastopexy techniques focus not only on removing excess skin, but also on reshaping and supporting the underlying breast parenchyma to improve long-term breast contour and upper pole shape. Rather than relying entirely on skin tension for lift, modern approaches increasingly emphasize internal tissue support and careful redistribution of breast volume.

The choice of pedicle design, including superior, superomedial, medial, or inferior pedicle techniques, is determined preoperatively based on breast anatomy, degree of ptosis, vascular reliability, and the planned repositioning of the nipple-areola complex. Preservation of blood supply, sensation, and tissue viability of the nipple-areola complex remains one of the most important principles in breast lift surgery.

Modern breast lift surgery also emphasizes scar optimization, proportional breast shape, preservation of natural contour, and maintenance of long-term structural support. Contemporary techniques aim to create a breast that appears elevated and youthful while maintaining soft tissue balance, natural movement, and functional sensibility.

=== Evaluating severity ===
The surgical management of breast ptosis is evaluated by the degree of severity.

- Grade I: Mild breast ptosis, which can be corrected with breast implant augmentation, or with a periareolar skin resection (crescent lift), with or without breast augmentation.
- Grade II: Moderate ptosis, which can be corrected with a circumareolar donut mastopexy technique featuring Benelli cerclage suturing; and with circumvertical-incision (lollipop mastopexy) techniques such as the Regnault B Mastopexy (and the Lejour–Lassus breast reduction).
- Grade III: Severe ptosis, which usually can be corrected with the circumvertical and horizontal incisions of the Anchor mastopexy (inverted-T incision), regardless of the type of pedicle used (inferior or superior).

=== Repairing false ptosis ===
Pseudoptosis, or false breast prolapse, can be addressed two ways:

- With a breast augmentation, or with a skin excision, or with both procedures; and without transposing the nipple-areola complex, which requires cutting the skin of the lower pole of the breast.
- With the circumareolar suturing that encircles the nipple-areola complex. To achieve the desired degree of breast lift in accordance with the woman's anatomy, the circumareolar mastopexy technique (circumvertical lift) can be modified with an additional vertical incision. The extra skin-envelope tissue remaining after a vertical-incision technique can either be gathered in a series of pleats, along the vertical limb of the incision, or can be resected, cut and removed, at the inframammary fold, thereby producing a horizontal incision of varying length, as in the circumvertical and horizontal breast lift.

== Mastopexy procedures ==
Pre-operative matters

The plastic surgeon delineates the mastopexy incision-plan upon the patient's breasts and torso; the principal corrective consideration is the correct level of the nipple-areola complex upon the breast hemisphere. In most women, the nipple should be located at, or slightly above, the inframammary fold, because emplacing it too high might later lead to a difficult revision surgery. The proper topographic locale for the nipple is determined by transposing the semicircular line of the inframammary fold to the face of the breast (anterior aspect), thereby configuring a circle, wherein the nipple-areola complex is centred. After determining the nipple locale, the surgeon delineates the remaining skin incisions of the correction, while maintaining the inferior limit of the vertical-incision at a distance above the pre-operative inframammary-fold, which precaution avoids extending the surgical scar to the chest wall after the lifting of the breast and the inframammary fold.

Intra-operative matters

The sole application of breast augmentation mammoplasty to correct minimal breast ptosis (Grade I) usually is effected with a breast implant prosthesis. The dual application of mastopexy and of breast augmentation surgeries — as one surgical procedure — requires thorough planning, because of the required resections of the parenchymal tissues. The periareolar incision lends itself to breast prosthesis implantation and to nipple-areola complex transposition, whilst maintaining the tissue viability of the nipple-areola complex.

The decision to perform mastopexy in patients with Grade I breast ptosis may depend on breast anatomy, tissue characteristics, and the patient's desired outcome. In a 2026 retrospective series of 198 patients treated with implant-only dual plane II augmentation, one patient (0.5%) subsequently underwent mastopexy. The authors proposed a clinical framework incorporating anatomical measurements, e timated glandular volume, patient education, and shared decision-making when considering augmentation alone rather than augmentation-mastopexy.

Mastopexy by internal surgical approach applies to the woman who has undergone explantation of breast prostheses. In operative praxis, the plastic surgeon elevates the flaps of the cut breast-implant capsules, and folds them in order to increase the volume of the internal mass of the breasts — thereby increasing the projection of the bust from the chest surface. The nipple-areola complex is elevated with plication sutures, and requires no skin resection when there is no excess skin.

Pedicles — superior, inferior, and medial

Although the aforementioned descriptions are of the incisions used to address the breast skin envelope, the surgical management of the breast tissue (parenchyma) is a separate consideration, including maintenance of the neurovascular integrity of the nipple-areola complex. The degree of hemispheric elevation of the nipple-areola complex determines the type of pedicle (superior, inferior, medial) that will provide the best venous and arterial vascular supply to the nipple-areola complex. Therefore, the application of the superior pedicle approach affords the surgeon greater procedural flexibility in determining the incision site for emplacing the breast implant, but it limits the possible degree of elevation of the nipple. Application of the inferior pedicle approach affords a greater degree of nipple-areola complex elevation, but makes difficult emplacing the breast implant, and the subsequent contouring of the breast. Application of the medial pedicle approach preserves breast sensation with a reliable venous and arterial vascular supply, and avoids the technical and procedural limitations of the superior pedicle and the inferior pedicle approaches.

Post-operative matters

After the breast-lift surgery, wound care is minimal when the sutured closure is subcuticular (under the epidermis), and reinforced with strips of absorbable adhesive tape (butterfly stitches) applied to maintain the wound closed.

Post-operative surgery scars upon the breast hemisphere can alter the way that the woman conducts her breast self-examination for cancerous changes to the tissues; thus exists the possibility that masses of necrotic fat might be mistakenly palpated as neoplasm lumps; or might be detected as such in the woman's scheduled mammogram examinations; nonetheless, such benign histologic changes usually are distinguishable from malignant neoplasms.

Complications

General medical complications of mastopexy include bleeding, infection, and the secondary effects of the anaesthesia. Specific complications include skin necrosis, and dysesthesia, abnormal changes in sensation (numbness and tingling). Serious medical complications include occurrences of seroma, a pocket of locally accumulated serous fluid, and occurrences of hematoma, a local accumulation of blood outside the vascular system. Necrosis of the nipple and necrosis of the skin flap (or both), when it occurs, can either be partial, and heal imperceptibly with wound care, or can be complete, and necessitate reconstruction. A complication of the Anchor mastopexy is the tension-caused wound breakdown at the junction of the three limbs of the incision, yet the scars usually heal without undergoing hypertrophy. Asymmetry of the bust is usually present pre-operatively, and the breast-lift surgery usually does not definitively eliminate it, regardless of the applied mastopexy technique or of the plastic surgeon's operative expertise. Moreover, a combined mastopexy–breast augmentation procedure can make the surgical revision of breast asymmetry more difficult because of the overstretched tissues of nipple-areola complex. Moreover, a possible, undesirable outcome of the periareolar mastopexy (circumareolar incision) is the underprojection of the corrected breast from the chest wall.

=== Mastopexy with medial pedicle flap ===
Pre-operative matters

To realize a breast lift using the medial pedicle technique, the surgeon delineates the incision plan upon the breasts, chest, and torso of the woman:

1. The breast meridian for the length of the sternum bone (from the sternal notch at the lower-throat) to the xiphoid process (at the lower tip).
2. An ellipse, centered upon and bisecting, the breast meridian line on the sternum.
3. The form and dimensions of the medial pedicle skin-flap, the base of which is above the midline of the ellipse. A 6 centimetres (2.4 in) long pedicle-base will provide an adequate vascular supply of venous and arterial blood to ensure the tissue viability of the nipple-areola complex.
4. A semicircle at the superior face of the ellipsis — either a hemisphere (1/2 circle) or a crescent (3/4 circle) — to indicate the transposed locale of the nipple-areola complex. The top of the semicircle is marked at 21 centimetres (8.3 in) from the superior margin of the sternal notch. In surgical praxis, the incision plan is modified to the woman's anatomy (height, weight, degree of ptosis), and the treatment of the parenchymal tissue.

Operative technique
Incision plan

After delineating the surgical incision-plan that establishes a technically reliable central axis of the front torso, and before cutting into the breast(s), the plastic surgeon confirms the topographic accuracy of the delineated incision plan, by triangulating the measures at the upper sternum and at the umbilicus, and modifying the incisional lines, if required. Afterwards, the surgical incision lines are infiltrated to the breast skin with a local anaesthetic mixture (lidocaine 1.0% and epinephrine 1:100,000) that constricts the pertinent vascular system to limit bleeding.

Pedicle skin-flap

After establishing the dimensions of the new nipple-areola complex, the surgeon de-epithelializes the medial pedicle skin-flap that provides the venous-arterial vascular system for the nipple-areola complex. The first incisions are through the parenchymal tissue, and separate the medial pedicle. The incision is effected to avoid undercutting the skin pedicle and so preserve the nipple-areola complex blood-supply vessels. Hence, the tissue volume of the pedicle flap is essential for establishing the adequate projection of the upper pole of the breast, where the breast originates from the chest. The surgeon resects (cuts and removes) an almost-triangular segment of tissue below the medial pedicle. Finally, for emplacing the nipple-areola complex, the incisions are completed by cutting the ellipse and the tissue adjacent to the medial pedicle.

If the incisions to the breast are satisfactory, the patient's homeostasis is feasible at that juncture of the mastopexy operation. The surgeon then evaluates the tissue-thickness of the medial pedicle flap, and its physical capability for rotating in a superomedial direction (above and to the center) with no resultant torsion tension to the tissue of the inferior portion of the pedicle; afterwards, the surgeon reduces the tissue thickness of the skin pedicle. Once positioned superiorly, the pedicle tissue thickness is reviewed to ascertain that it fits into the new position, without undue pressure or constriction; thus are assured the tissue viability of the medial pedicle and of the nipple-areola complex.

Symmetry

The critical procedural step in forming the new breast is the collecting and the joining of the three folds of breast tissue (the medial pillar and the two lateral pillars) of the lower pole of the breast, where it meets the chest. The suturing is critical to supporting and shaping the flaccid breast tissues into a hemispheric breast-mound that well projects from the chest wall—a lifted breast. The supine patient then is elevated to a sitting position so that the breasts drape naturally, and the surgeon then delineates upon them the incision plan for the resection (cutting and removing) of the excess folds of skin from the lower sides (inferolateral) and the lower midline (inferomedial) of the new breast. Afterwards, the patient is laid supine, and the excess breast skin is cut; to avoid a scar at the inframammary fold, a purse-string closure gathers the excess folds of skin at the lower pole of the breast; in due course, the three joined pillars of skin will integrate to the inframammary fold. Again, the supine patient is elevated to a sitting position so that the surgeon can ascertain the size, shape, and symmetry, or asymmetry, of the corrected breasts. If the degree of breast-lift is satisfactory, the patient is re-laid to the operating table, and the plastic surgeon sutures the incision wounds.

Post-operative matters

During the initial post-operative period, the plastic surgeon examines the patient for occurrences of hematoma, and to evaluate the histologic viability of the breast-pedicle skin flaps and of the nipple-areola complex.

During the first three weeks of post-operative convalescence, the surgeon monitors the healing of the mastopexy wounds during weekly consultations with the patient. Depending upon the wound-healing progress of the woman, more or fewer follow-up examinations shall follow.

Complications

Tissue necrosis of the nipple-areola complex is the principal mastopexy medical complication. To prevent nipple-areola complex necrosis, the surgeon monitors and evaluates the viability of the transposed tissue; by the presence of oxygenated, bright red arterial blood demonstrates the proper functioning of the nipple-areola complex vascular system. A more common post-operative nipple-areola complex complication is dysesthesia, manifest as an abnormal sensation of numbness, and as a sensation of tingling, that perdures for the wound-healing period, yet it diminishes as the full functioning of the breast's innervation resumes the full sensitivity to the nipple-areola complex; nonetheless, permanent numbness of the nipple-areola complex is rare.

Tissue necrosis of the medial pedicle flap is a potential, but rare, complication of mastopexy procedures. Moreover, the occurrence of hematoma also is possible; in post-operative praxis, a large hematoma is drained immediately, whereas a small hematoma can be observed for self-resolution, before draining.

Wound dehiscence, the bursting of a surgical wound at the line of closure sutures, is a medical complication resulting from the poor healing of the wound. Unless wound dehiscence aesthetically compromises the breast-lift outcome, it is managed conservatively.

Breast contour irregularities occurred when the tissues of the inferior part of the incision are gathered to avoid forming a scar at the inframammary fold. If the complications do not self-resolve, if the tissues do not flatten, or become smooth, they are revised with additional surgery.

=== Mastopexy with B-pedicle ===
B mastopexy or Regnault mastopexy technique

The B mastopexy (breast lift) is a variation of the circumvertical approach that features an inverted, upper-case letter-B incision, which, when performed with simultaneous breast augmentation via submuscular or subglandular implantation of the breast prosthesis, restores the natural contour and appearance of the breasts. Moreover, the B mastopexy technique can procedurally include the simultaneous microliposuction to reduce the lateral parenchymal and adipose tissues in order to achieve the correct size, volume, and contour of the corrected breasts. The B mastopexy can correct several types of breast deformity, every form of breast ptosis, and breast hypertrophy; it usually has low incidence rates of hypertrophic scarring, and of loss of sensation in the nipple-areola complex; furthermore, the B mastopexy technique also applies to reduction mammoplasty, the correction of oversized breasts.

The technical and procedural efficacy of the B-technique mastopexy was established in Clinical Techniques: B Mastopexy: Versatility and 5-Year Experience (2007), a retrospective study of a 40-woman mammoplasty cohort upon whom were performed 13 breast-lift procedures without breast augmentation, and 27 procedures with simultaneous breast augmentation, using a medium-sized breast implant. The cohort reported no medical complications, only one woman underwent scar-revision surgery; and each of the 40 women was satisfied with her mastopexy outcome.

Surgical consultation — The plastic surgeon explains the technical and aesthetic considerations of the breast lift operation to the woman. That the B technique mastopexy yields improved aesthetic results with a breast-skin pedicle created with a curvilinear incision (an inverted, upper-case letter-B). That said curvilinear incision technique eliminates the medial vertical incision of the Anchor mastopexy, and so creates a lifted bust with breasts of natural size, appearance, and contour, and few surgical scars. The consultation includes detailed, pre-operative, post-operative, and healing-stage photographs that illustrate the nature and extent of the mastopexy incisions and the resultant scars. That the full healing (scar maturation) might require approximately one year to establish the final contour of the lifted breasts, after the suspensory ligaments and the parenchymal tissue have settled into and upon the chest as an aesthetically satisfactory bust of natural size, appearance, and contour.

Pre-operative matters

To the standing patient, the plastic surgeon delineates the mastopexy incision-plan to the chest, breasts, and torso of the woman. The distance from the suprasternal notch (atop the sternum) to the nipple is measured and recorded to the medical record; the level of the inframammary fold is identified and delineated to the front of the breast (anterior aspect), which indicates the elevated locale to which the nipple-areola complex will be transposed. The medial aspect of the new nipple-areola complex locale is marked approximately 10 to 11 centimetres (3.9 to 4.3 in) from the midline, along the mid-breast; and a semicircle with a 38-mm-diameter is delineated around the nipple; the distance of the semicircle from the ptotic nipple-areola complex indicates the new locale of the nipple-areola complex upon the breast hemisphere.

Operative technique
Incision plan

With the patient laid supine upon the operating table, the surgeon performs a free-hand, curvilinear delineation of an inverted, upper-case letter-B pattern to the breast. Then, per the landmarks of the initial incision-plan, a semicircular pattern is delineated around the nipple-areola complex. The vertical and horizontal component-incisions of the B mastopexy are created with a tapering, curvilinear incision that begins from the lower margin of the areola to the lateral crease of the breast. The B-pattern incision results in a vertical closure 5 to 7 centimetres (2.0 to 2.8 in) long, from the bottom margin of the nipple-areola complex to the inframammary fold.

Wound closure

The surgeon tests the closure tension of the wound sutures by in-folding the breast over the index finger, and towards the transposed nipple-areola complex, to observe if the skin blanches (whitens) or over-stretches, afterwards, the nipple-areola complex-area dermis is de-epithelialized. In the combined mastopexy–augmentation procedure, wherein the breast prosthesis is emplaced to a submuscular implant pocket, an anaesthetic tumescent solution is injected along the marked incision line. When the breast implant will be emplaced to a subglandular implant pocket, the hypodermic needle penetrates un-resisted into the anatomic plane above the pectoralis major muscle; the tumescent solution anaesthesia allows blunt dissection. After establishing anaesthesia, the surgeon de-epithelializes each edge of skin by undermining it 3 to 4 mm (0.12 to 0.16 in), with a razor scalpel, thereby facilitating the closing of the surgical wound without tight sutures. In a mastopexy–augmentation, the breast-implant pocket (locale) determines when the surgeon performs the de-epithelialization of the B pedicle; for submuscular implantation, the skin pedicle de-epithelialization is performed after the emplacement; for subglandular implantation, the skin pedicle de-epithelialization is performed before the emplacement.

If the mastopexy includes simultaneous breast augmentation with submuscular emplacement, the surgeon observes that the pectoralis major muscle is divided from the sternum and the ribs. After cutting the implant pocket, the surgeon then de-epithelializes the B-pedicle. To facilitate the dermal closure (joining the wound edges) with minimal tension to the sutures, the breast implant either is displaced up, into the implant pocket, or is partially deflated. For the subglandular emplacement of breast implants, the technique is different; the de-epithelialization of the pedicle dermis is performed initially, after which an incision is made through the de-epithelialized dermis, at the base of the vertical limb of the mastopexy, and then, by means of blunt dissection, an implant pocket is cut above the pectoralis major muscle.

Symmetry

During the dermal closure, the nipple-areola complex is transposed to its new locale, as determined by the skin pedicle. To create the curvilinear scar, the deep dermal closure is accomplished by rotating the lateral flap down and then medially. The deep dermis is approximated (joined) with sutures, in a simple, interrupted fashion. The key suture is emplaced at the junction where the apex of the vertical incision meets the nipple-areola complex—because it is the skin area of the breast subject to the greatest tension(s). The subcutaneous dermal closure is effected with interrupted sutures. As required, the final adjustments before suturing the skin closed, might include either micro-liposuction or additional de-epithelialization. After the dermal closure, a suture is emplaced to achieve the continuous approximation of the nipple-areola complex to the adjacent skin edge, and to the lower skin incisions.

Post-operative matters

Convalescence — Post-operative care is minimal after a mastopexy procedure; the lifted breasts are supported with a porous, soft elastic tape, which is removed at 7–10 days post-operative, and then is reapplied to the mastopexy incisions for an additional 1–2 weeks during convalescence. For comfortable healing of the wounds, the woman wears a surgical brassière, and avoids wearing an underwire brassière until the breast implants have settled into position. The mastopexy outcome is photographed at 2–3 months post-operative.

=== Mastopexy technique observations ===
Mastopexic correction results in surgical scars on the lifted breasts; the periareolar mastopexy outcome often is a breast of bottom-heavy appearance, with puckered surgical scars; and the Anchor mastopexy outcome is an aesthetic breast of natural size, look, and feel, but with many scars. Whereas, advocates of the mechanical principle of the B technique mastopexy propose that the creation of a rotational pedicle (with an elevated epidermal flap that rotates around the nipple-areola complex), lifts the breasts with an incision plan with vertical and horizontal incisions that eliminate the medial incision (and its vertical scar), whilst providing good projection of the corrected bust from the chest, and a viable nipple-areola complex. Furthermore, advocates of the B technique mastopexy report that it usually does not require secondary correction, because it allows for the better transposition of excess lateral tissues of the breasts by means of curvilinear incision (inverted, upper-case, letter-B) to the skin envelope.

== See also ==
- Breast
- Breast augmentation (augmentation mammoplasty)
- Breast implant
- Breast reduction (reduction mammoplasty)
- Mammoplasty
- Plastic surgery
