= Breast reduction =

Plastic surgery procedure

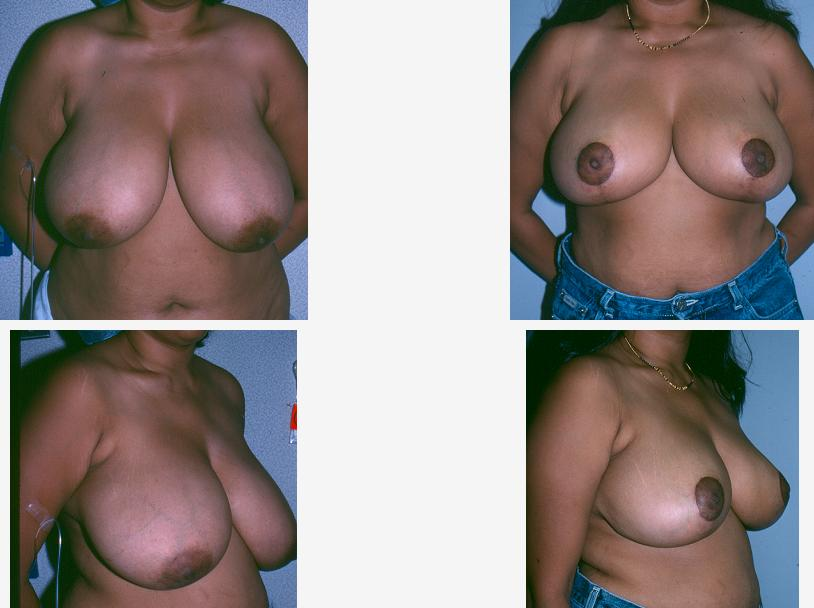
- Breast reduction: the correction of macromastia and severe breast ptosis; pre-operative aspects (left); post-operative aspects (right)
- ICD-9-CM: 85.3
- MedlinePlus: 007405

Reduction mammoplasty (also breast reduction and reduction mammaplasty) is the plastic surgery procedure for reducing the size of large breasts. In a breast reduction surgery aimed at re-establishing a functional bust that is proportionate to the patient's body, the critical corrective consideration is the tissue viability of the nipple–areola complex (NAC), to ensure the functional sensitivity and lactational capability of the breasts. The indications for breast reduction surgery are three-fold – physical, aesthetic, and psychological – the restoration of the bust, of the patient's self-image, and of the patient's mental health.

In corrective practice, the surgical techniques and praxis for reduction mammoplasty also are applied to mastopexy (breast lift).

== Presentation ==
The patient with macromastia presents heavy, enlarged breasts that sag and cause chronic pains to the head, neck, shoulders, and back; an oversized bust also causes secondary health problems, such as poor blood circulation, impaired breathing (inability to fill the lungs with air); chafing of the skin of the chest and the lower breast (inframammary intertrigo); brassière-strap indentations to the shoulders; and the improper fit of clothes.

In the patient affected by gigantomastia (>1,000 gm overweight per breast), the average breast-volume reduction diminished the oversized bust by three brassière cup-sizes. The surgical reduction of abnormally enlarged breasts resolves the physical symptoms and the functional limitations imposed by a bodily disproportionate bust; thereby, it improves a patient's physical and mental health. Afterwards, the patient's ability to comfortably perform physical activities previously impeded by oversized breasts improves emotional health (self-esteem) by reducing anxiety and lessening psychological depression.

=== Medical history ===
The medical history records the patient's age, the number of children the patient has borne, the patient's breast-feeding practices, plans for pregnancy and nursing of the infant, medication allergies, and tendency to bleeding. Additional to the personal medical information are the patient's history of tobacco smoking and concomitant diseases, breast-surgery and breast-disease histories, family history of breast cancer, and complaints of neck, back, shoulder pain, breast sensitivity, rashes, infection, and upper extremity numbness.

The physical examination records and establishes the accurate measures of the patient's body mass index, vital signs, the mass of each breast, the degree of inframammary intertrigo present, the degree of breast ptosis, the degree of enlargement of each breast, lesions to the skin envelope, the degree of sensation in the nipple–areola complex (NAC), and discharges from the nipple. Also noted are the secondary effects of the enlarged breasts, such as shoulder-notching by the brassière strap from the breast weight, kyphosis (excessive, backwards curvature of the thoracic region of the spinal column), skin irritation, and skin rash affecting the breast crease (IMF).

=== Cause ===
Large breasts are usually developed during thelarche (the pubertal breast-development stage), but they can also develop postpartum, after gaining weight, at menopause, and at any age. Macromastia usually develops in consequence to the hypertrophy (overdevelopment) of adipose fat, rather than to milk-gland hypertrophy. Moreover, many are genetically predisposed to developing large breasts, the size and weight of which are often increased, either by pregnancy, by weight gain, or by both conditions; there also exist iatrogenic (physician-caused) conditions such as post–mastectomy and post–lumpectomy asymmetry. Nonetheless, it is statistically rare for a young person to experience juvenile mammary hypertrophy that results in massive, oversized breasts, and recurrent breast hypertrophy.

The abnormal enlargement of the breast tissues to a volume in excess of the normal bust-to-body proportions can be caused either by the overdevelopment of the milk glands or of the adipose tissue, or by a combination of both occurrences of hypertrophy. The resultant breast-volume increases can range from the mild (<300 gm) to the moderate (ca. 300–800 gm) to the severe (>800 gm). Macromastia can be manifested either as a unilateral condition or as a bilateral condition (single-breasted enlargement or double-breasted enlargement) that can occur in combination with sagging, breast ptosis that is determined by the degree to which the nipple has descended below the inframammary fold (IMF).

=== Therapeutic approaches ===
==== Medical ====
Breast hypertrophy (macromastia and gigantomastia) does not respond to medical therapy, but a weight-reduction regimen for the certain patients can alleviate some of the excessive size and volume of abnormally enlarged breasts. Physical therapy provides some relief for neck, back, or shoulder pain. Skin care will diminish breast crease inflammation and lessen the symptoms caused by moisture, such as irritation, chafing, infection, and bleeding.

==== Surgical ====
The traditional surgical techniques for breast reduction remodel the breast mound using a skin and glandular (breast tissue) pedicle (inferior, superior, central), and then trim and re-drape the skin envelope into a new breast of natural size, shape, and contour; it produces long surgical scars upon the breast hemisphere. In response, L. Benelli, in 1990, presented the round block mammoplasty, a minimal-scar periareolar incision technique that produces only a periareolar scar – around the NAC, where the dark-to-light skin-color transition hides the surgical scar.

== Anatomy of the breast ==
=== The procedure ===
A reduction mammoplasty to re-size enlarged breasts and to correct breast ptosis resects (cuts and removes) excess tissues (glandular, adipose, skin), overstretched suspensory ligaments, and transposes the NAC higher upon the breast hemisphere. During puberty, the breast grows in consequence to the influences of the hormones estrogen and progesterone; as a mammary gland, the breast is composed of lobules of glandular tissue, each of which is drained by a lactiferous duct that empties to the nipple. Most of the volume (ca. 90%) and rounded contour of the breasts are conferred by the adipose fat interspersed amongst the lobules, except during pregnancy and lactation, when breast milk constitutes most of the breast volume.

=== Composition ===
Surgically, the breast is an apocrine gland overlaying the chest – attached at the nipple and suspended with ligaments from the chest – which is integral to the skin, the body integument of the individual. The dimensions and weight of the breasts vary with age and habitus (body build and physical constitution); hence, small-to-medium-sized breasts weigh approximately 500 gm, or less, and large breasts weigh approximately 750–1,000 gm. Anatomically, the breast topography and the hemispheric locale of the NAC are particular to each individual; thus, the desirable, average measurements are a 21–23 cm sternal distance (nipple to sternum-bone notch), and a 5–7 cm inferior-limb distance (NAC to IMF).

=== Blood supply and innervation ===
The arterial blood supply of the breast has medial and lateral vascular components; it is supplied with blood by the internal mammary artery (from the medial aspect), the lateral thoracic artery (from the lateral aspect), and the 3rd, 4th, 5th, 6th, and 7th intercostal perforating arteries. Drainage of venous blood from the breast is by the superficial vein system under the dermis, and by the deep vein system parallel to the artery system. The primary lymph drainage system is the retromammary lymph plexus in the pectoral fascia. Sensation in the breast is established by the peripheral nervous system innervation of the anterior and lateral cutaneous branches of the 4th, 5th, and 6th intercostal nerves, and thoracic spinal nerve 4 (T4 nerve) innervates and supplies sensation to the NAC.

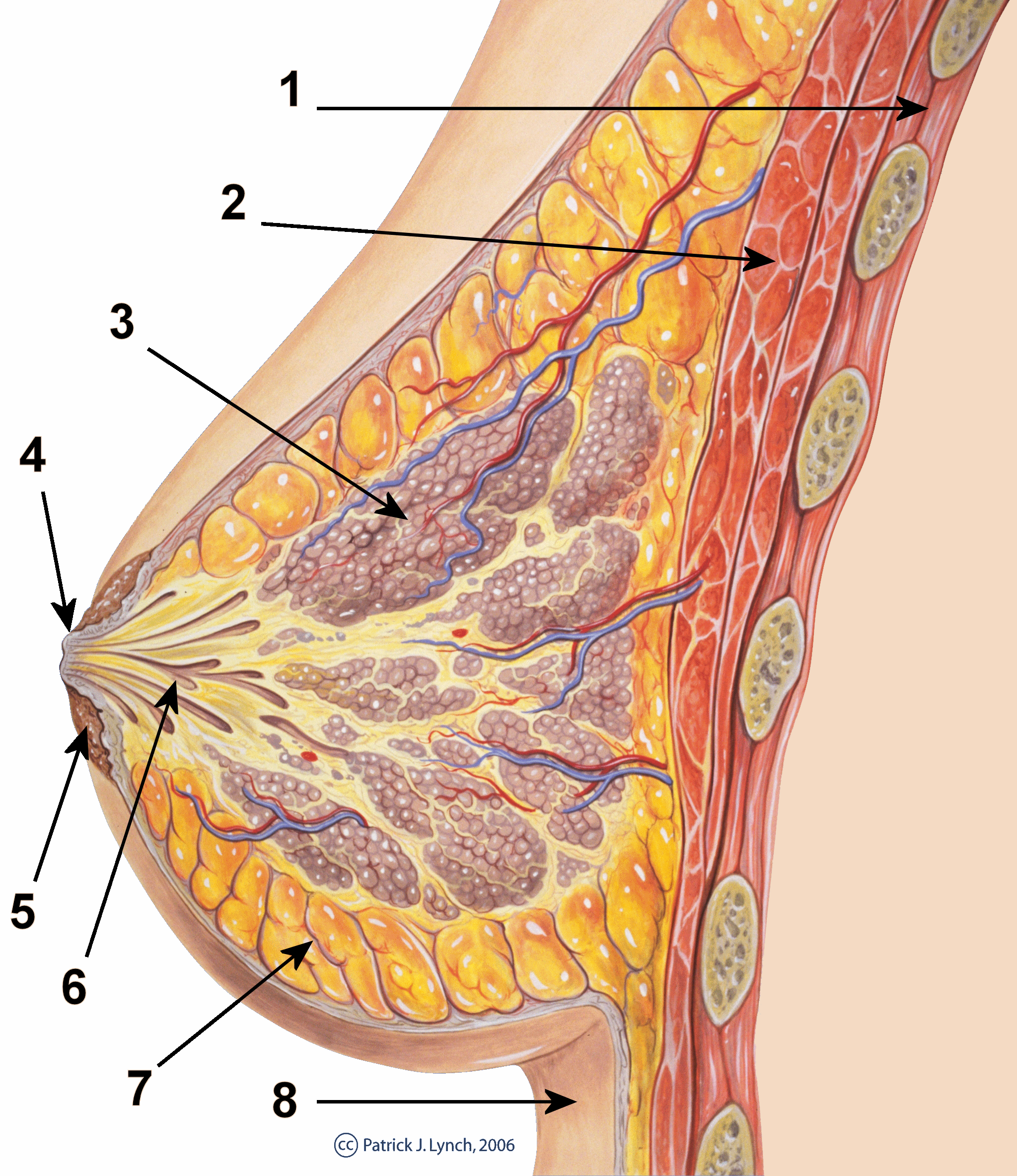
Surgical anatomy of the mammary gland for reduction mammoplasty correction: 1. Chest wall; 2. Pectoralis muscles; 3. Lobules; 4. Nipple; 5. Areola; 6. Milk duct; 7. Fatty tissue; 8. Skin envelope

=== Mechanical structures of the breast ===
In realizing the breast-reduction corrections, the plastic surgeon takes anatomic and histologic account of the biomechanical, load-bearing properties of the glandular, adipose, and skin tissues that compose and support the breast; among the properties of the soft tissues of the breast is near-incompressibility (Poisson's ratio of ~0.5).

1. Rib cage. The 2nd, 3rd, 4th, 5th, and 6th ribs of the thoracic cage are the structural supports for the mammary glands.
2. Chest muscles. The breasts overlay the pectoralis major muscle, the pectoralis minor muscle, and the intercostal muscles (between the ribs), and can extend to and cover a portion of the (front) anterior serratus muscle (attached to the ribs, the rib muscles, and the shoulder blade), and to the rectus abdominis muscle (a long, flat muscle extending up the torso, from pubic bone to rib cage). The body posture of the patient exerts physical stresses upon the pectoralis major muscles and the pectoralis minor muscles, which cause the weight of the breasts to induce static and dynamic shear forces (when standing and when walking), compression forces (when lying supine), and tension forces (when kneeling on four limbs).
3. Pectoralis fascia. The pectoralis major muscle is covered with a thin superficial membrane, the pectoral fascia, which has many prolongations intercalated among its fasciculi (fascicles); at the midline, it is attached to the front of the sternum, above it is attached to the clavicle (collar bone), while laterally and below, it is continuous with the fascia.
4. Suspensory ligaments. The subcutaneous layer of adipose tissue in the breast is traversed with thin suspensory ligaments (Cooper's ligaments) that extend obliquely to the skin surface, and from the skin to the deep pectoral fascia. The structural stability provided by the Cooper's ligaments derives from its closely packed bundles of collagen fibers oriented in parallel; the principal, ligament-component cell is the fibroblast, interspersed throughout the parallel collagen-fiber bundles of the shoulder, axilla, and thorax ligaments.
5. Glandular tissue. As a mammary gland, the breast comprises lobules (milk glands at each lobe-tip) and the lactiferous ducts (milk passages), which widen to form an ampulla (sac) at the nipple.
6. Adipose tissue. The fat tissue of the breast is composed of lipidic fluid (60–85% weight) that is 90–99 percent triglycerides, free fatty acids, diglycerides, cholesterol phospholipids, and minute quantities of cholesterol esters, and monoglycerides; the other components are water (5–30% weight) and protein (2–3% weight).
7. Fatty tissue. In biology, adipose tissue (/ˈædəˌpoʊs/), or body fat, fat depot, or just fat, is loose connective tissue composed of adipocytes. It is technically composed of roughly only 80% fat; fat in its solitary state exists in the liver and muscles. Adipose tissue is derived from lipoblasts. Its main role is to store energy in the form of lipids, although it also cushions and insulates the body. Far from hormonally inert, adipose tissue has in recent years been recognized as a major endocrine organ[1], as it produces hormones such as leptin, resistin, and the cytokine TNFα. Moreover, adipose tissue can affect other organ systems of the body and may lead to disease. Obesity or being overweight in humans and most animals does not depend on body weight but on the amount of body fat – to be specific, adipose tissue. Two types of adipose tissue exist: white adipose tissue (WAT) and brown adipose tissue (BAT). The formation of adipose tissue appears to be controlled in part by the adipose gene. Adipose tissue was first identified by the Swiss naturalist Conrad Gessner in 1551.
8. The skin envelope. The breast skin is in three layers: (i) the epidermis, (ii) the dermis, and (iii) the hypodermis. The epidermis is 50–100 μm thick, and is composed of a stratum corneum of flat keratin cells, that is 10–20 μm thick; it protects the underlying viable epidermis, which is composed of keratinizing epithelial cells. The dermis is mostly collagen and elastin fibers embedded to a viscous water and glycoprotein medium. The fibers of the upper dermis ("papillary dermis") are thinner than the fibers of the deep dermis, thus the skin envelope is 1–3 mm thick. The thickness of the hypodermis (adipocyte cells) varies between individuals, and between body parts. The skin of the nipple and areola is further composed of a modified and specialized myoepithelium that is responsible for contraction in response to stimuli.

== Surgical procedures ==
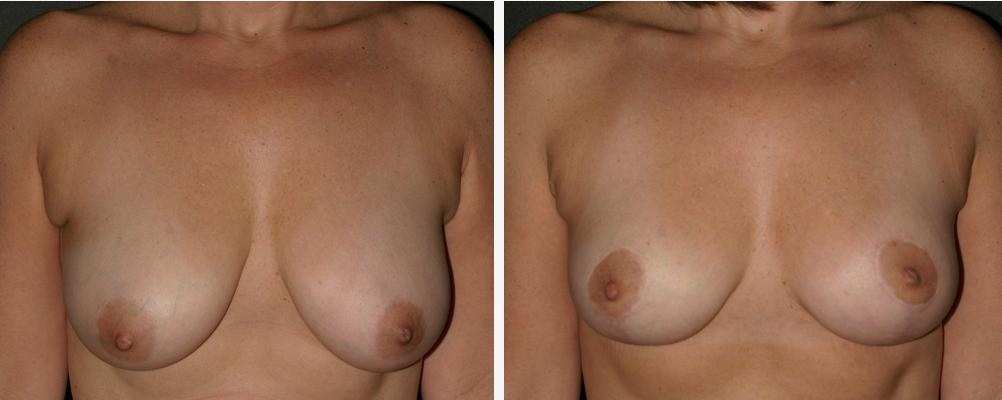
Breast reduction: the pre-operative (left) and post-operative (right) aspects of the correction of macromastia and breast ptosis in a young woman

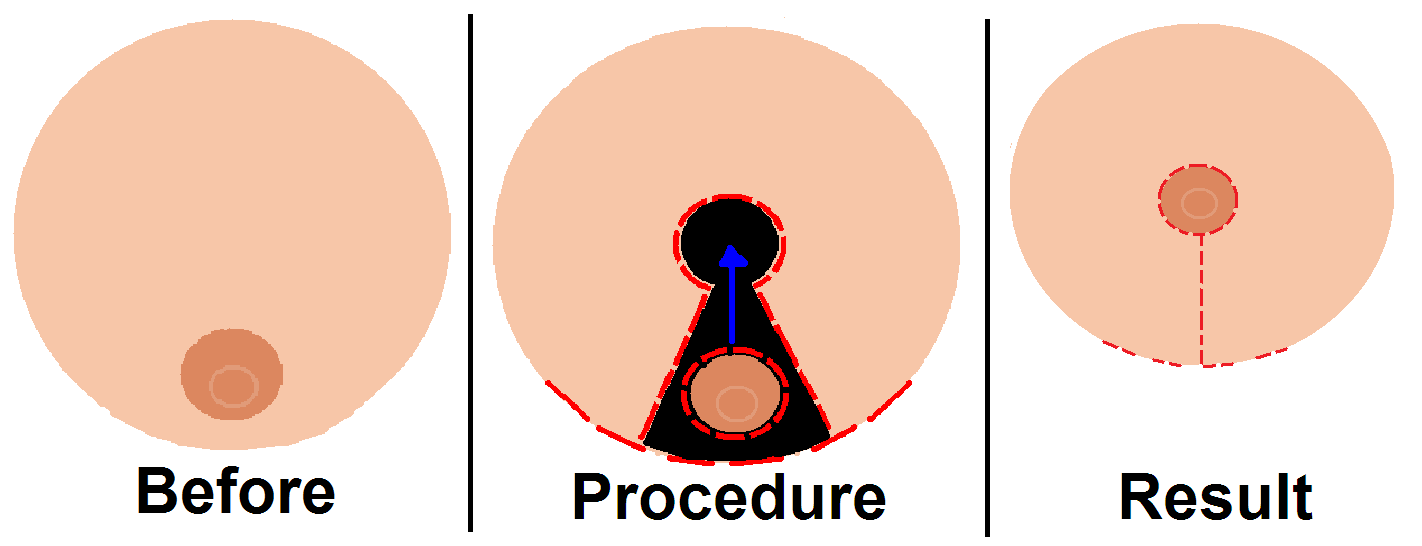
Reduction mammoplasty: The keyhole incision plan for correcting macromastia; the sagging, hypertrophied breast (left), the surgical reduction procedure (center), the reduced, elevated breast (right)

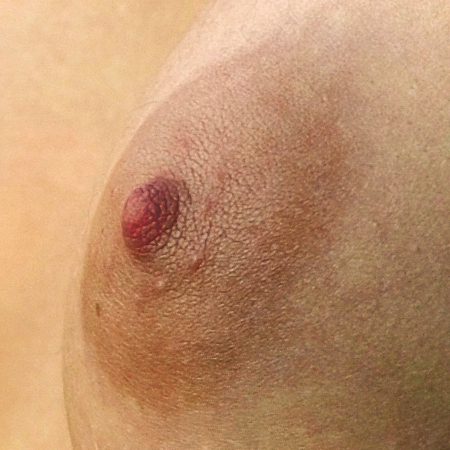
Breast reduction: foremost is the tissue viability of the NAC; it also hides a periareolar scar in the skin-color transition at the areolar periphery.

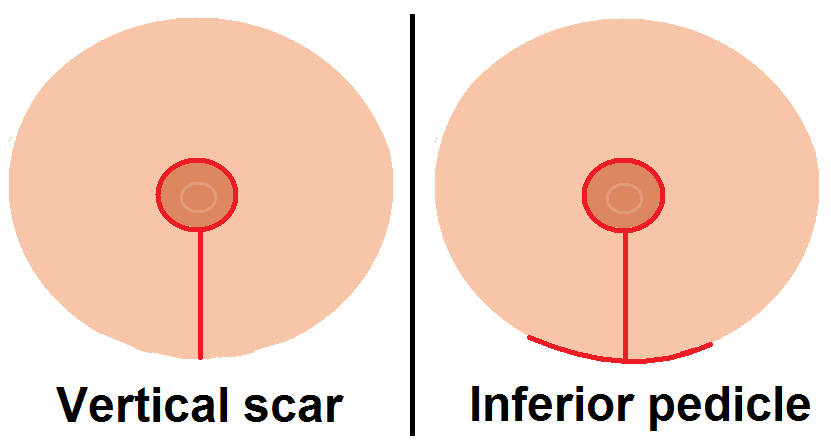
Reduction mammoplasty: The vertical scar technique (lollipop incision) and the inferior pedicle flap technique (anchor incision) also are applicable to breast lift surgery.

=== General ===
Reduction mammoplasty, either surgery or lipectomy, proportionately re-sizes the enlarged, sagging breasts of a patient affected with macromastia (>500 gm increase per breast) or with gigantomastia (>1,000 gm increase per breast). Breast reduction surgery has two technical aspects: (i) the skin-incision pattern and the skin- and glandular-tissue excision technique applied for access to and removal of breast parenchyma tissue. The incision pattern and the area of skin-envelope tissue to be removed determine the locales and the lengths of the surgical scars; (ii) the final shape and contour of the reduced breast are determined by the area of the tissues remaining in the breast, and that the skin- and glandular-tissue pedicle has a proper supply of nerves and blood vessels (arterial and venous) that ensure its tissue viability.

The specific reduction mammoplasty procedure is determined by the volume of breast tissues (glandular, adipose, skin) to be resected (cut and removed) from each breast, and the degree of breast ptosis present: Pseudoptosis (sagging of the inferior pole of the breast; the nipple is at or above the inframammary fold); Grade I: Mild ptosis (the nipple is below the IMF, but above the lower pole of the breast); Grade II: Moderate ptosis (the nipple is below the IMF; yet some lower-pole breast tissue hangs lower than the nipple); Grade III: Severe ptosis (the nipple is far below the IMF; no breast tissue is below the nipple). The full, corrective outcome of the surgical re-establishment of a bodily proportionate bust becomes evident at 6-months to 1-year post-operative, during which period the reduced and lifted breast tissues settle upon and into the chest. The post-operative convalescence is weeks long, depending upon the corrections performed; and some patients may experience painful breast-enlargement during the first post-operative menstruation.

==== Contraindications ====
Breast reduction surgery cannot be performed if the patient is lactating, or has recently ceased lactating; if the patient's breasts contain unevaluated tissue masses, or unidentified microcalcifications; if the patient has a systemic illness; if the patient is unable to understand the technical limitations of the plastic surgery; or, if the patient cannot accept the possible medical complications of the procedure. Additionally, recent research has indicated that mammograms should not be done with any increased frequency in patients undergoing breast surgery, including breast augmentation, mastopexy, and breast reduction.

==== I. Inferior pedicle technique (anchor pattern, inverted-T incision, Wise pattern) ====
The inferior pedicle (central mound) features a blood vessel supply (arterial and venous) for the NAC from an inferior, centrally-based attachment to the chest wall. The skin pedicle maintains the innervation and vascular viability of the NAC, which produces a reduced, sensitive breast with full lactational capability and function. The volume and size reduction of hypertrophied breasts is performed with a periareolar incision to the NAC, which then extends downwards, following the natural curve of the breast hemisphere. After cutting and removing the requisite quantities of tissue (glandular, adipose, skin), the NAC is transposed higher upon the breast hemisphere; thereby, the inferior pedicle technique produces an elevated bust with breasts that are proportionate to the patients's person. Breast-reduction with an inferior pedicle occasionally produces breasts that appear squared; despite this, the technique effectively reduces the very enlarged breasts of macromastia and gigantomastia.

==== II. Vertical scar technique (lollipop incision) ====
The breast reduction performed with the vertical-scar technique usually produces a well-projected bust featuring breasts with short incision scars and a NAC elevated by means of a pedicle (superior, medial, lateral) that maintains the biologic and functional viability of the NAC. The increased projection of the reduced bust is achieved by medially gathering the folds of the skin-envelope and suturing the inner and outer portions of the remaining breast gland to provide a support pillar, and upward projection of the NAC . The vertical-scar reduction mammoplasty is best suited for removing small areas of the skin envelope and small volumes of internal tissues (glandular, adipose) from the lateral and the inferior portions of the breast hemisphere; thus the short incision scars.

==== III. Horizontal scar technique ====
The breast reduction performed with the horizontal-scar technique features a horizontal incision along the inframammary fold (IMF) and a NAC pedicle. To elevate the NAC, the technique usually employs either an inferior pedicle or an inferior-lateral pedicle, and features no vertical incision (like the anchor pattern). The horizontal-scar technique best applies to the patient whose oversized breasts are too large for a vertical-incision technique (e.g. the lollipop pattern); and it has two therapeutic advantages: no vertical incision-scar to the breast hemisphere, and better healing of the periareolar scar of the transposed NAC. The potential disadvantages are box-shaped breasts with thick (hypertrophied) incision scars, especially at the inframammary fold.

==== IV. Free nipple-graft technique ====
The breast reduction performed with the free nipple-graft technique transposes the NAC as a tissue graft without a blood supply, without a skin and glandular pedicle. The therapeutic advantage is that a greater volume of breast tissues (glandular, adipose, skin) can be resected to produce a proportionate breast. However, the NAC will lose sensation and lactational capability. This may be medically indicated in patients whose health presents a high risk of ischemia (localized tissue anemia) of the NAC, which can cause tissue necrosis; patients with diabetes; patients who smoke tobacco; patient whose oversized breasts have an approximate NAC-to-IMF measure of 20 cm; or patients with macromastia, requiring significant resecting of the breast tissues.

==== V. Liposuction-only technique (lipectomy) ====
The breast reduction performed with the liposuction-only technique usually applies to the patient whose oversized breasts require the removal of a medium volume of internal tissue, and to the patient whose health precludes the extended anaesthesia typical of surgical breast-reduction operations. The ideal lipectomy candidate is the patient whose low-density breasts are principally composed of adipose tissue, have a relatively elastic skin envelope, and manifest mild ptosis. The therapeutic advantages of the liposuction-only technique are the small incision-scars required for access to the breast interior; hence, a shorter post-operative healing period for the incision scars. The therapeutic disadvantage is limited breast-reduction volumes.

== Surgical techniques ==
=== Pre-operative matters ===
The medical treatment records for the reduction mammoplasty are established with pre-operative, multi-perspective photographs of the oversized breasts, the sternal-notch–to-nipple distances, and the nipple-to–inframammary-fold distances. The patient is instructed about the purposes of the breast reduction surgery; the achievable corrections; the expected final size, shape, and contour of the reduced breasts; the expected final appearance of the breast reduction scars; possible changes in the sensation of the NAC; possible changes in breast-feeding capability; and possible medical complications. The patient also is instructed about post-operative matters, such as convalescence, and the proper care of the surgical wounds to the breasts.

Incision-plan delineation: to the breasts of the standing patient, the plastic surgeon delineates the mosque dome skin-incision plan, and the area representing the superior pedicle (composed of skin and glandular tissues), the breast midline, the inframammary fold (IMF), and the vertical axis of the breast, beneath the IMF. The upper edge of the (future) NAC is marked slightly below the IMF-level, and a semicircle of 16-cm maximum diameter. In relation to the vertical axis, the mosque dome incision plan displaces the breast to the middle and to the side; the peripheral limbs of the incision plan are marked so that they approximate (join) at no less than 5-cm above the inframammary fold. The circumference of the (future) NAC is delineated around the nipple, and a superior pedicle (10-cm wide minimum) is delineated at the upper-border of the future NAC circumference; the incision-plan delineation continues down as a cone, and around the marked circumference.

=== Operative technique ===
The patient is laid supine upon the operating table so that the surgeon can later raise them to a sitting position that will allow visual comparison of the drape of the breasts, and an accurate assessment of the post-operative symmetry of the reduced and lifted bust. Afterwards, the pedicle epidermis surrounding the NAC is cut, and adipose tissue is liposuctioned from the breast. The medial, lower, and lateral segments of the breast are resected (cut and removed), by undermining the skin below the lower curved line. Then, the NAC is transposed higher upon the breast hemisphere. The pillars of parenchymal tissue are approximated (joined), and the skin envelope is sutured. There is no evidence to support using drains during breast reduction surgery.

=== Notes ===
- Biological: The resected tissue is submitted to histopathologic examination, because sub-clinical breast cancer foci occur in 0.1–0.9 percent of the tissue specimens.
- Technical: The original Lejour technique incision plan had no horizontal limbs, and so did not produce horizontal scars; however, contemporary variants, such as the Modified Lejour Technique, employ small, horizontal incisions along the inframammary fold, in order to avoid redundant skin folds, especially in the reduction of very oversized breasts.

=== Post-operative matters ===
The patient is instructed to resume normal life activities, and to eat a light diet, post-operative, on the day of the breast reduction surgery; to resume washing in a shower at 1-day post-operative; to avoid strenuous physical activity, and to wear a sports brassière; the convalescence regimen is for three-months post-operative. The patient is also informed that the wrinkles at the bottom of the vertical limb of the scar usually resolve and fade within one–six months post-operative, but some cases may require surgical revision of the vertical scar. Scheduled follow-up consultations ensure a satisfactory outcome to the breast reduction surgery, and facilitate the early identification and management of medical complications.

Limited evidence shows no significant benefit in the use of wound drains after reduction mammoplasty.

=== Complications ===
The post-operative complications occurred include seroma, wound dehiscence, hematoma; partial NAC necrosis occurred in 10% of the reduced breasts, but, after refinement of the Lejour technique, the study Vertical Mammaplasty: Early Complications After 250 Personal Consecutive Cases (1999) reported a reduced incidence rate of 7.0 percent in the 324 breast reductions performed in 167 patients. Moreover, the incidence of such post-operative complications is greater among the patients whose breasts required large-volume resection of the parenchyma; in patients who were obese; in patients who were tobacco smokers; and in young patients. Furthermore, wound dehiscence, epidermolysis, adipose tissue necrosis, and infection occur less among patients who undergo Lejour-technique breast reduction than among patients who undergo a periareolar, anchor pattern breast-reduction, or an inferior-pedicle breast reduction, however complication rates are significantly higher rate when the body mass index is greater than 30 kg/m. Nonetheless, bottom-edge asymmetry occurs more among Lejour-technique patients; the revision surgery rates can be up to 10 percent. Moreover, the liposuctioning of the breast does not increase the rate of local medical complications; decreased NAC sensitivity occurs in 10 percent of patients, and total NAC insensitivity occurs in 1.0 percent of women.

=== Liposuction-only technique ===
The reliability of the lipectomy procedure was confirmed in two studies. The first, Tumescent Technique, Tumescent Anesthesia & Microcannular Liposuction (2000), reported that tumescent liposuction is a reliable reduction mammoplasty procedure, which yields consistent results of size, appearance, and texture of the reduced-volume breasts. The second study by Daniel Lanzer, Breast Reduction with Liposuction (2002), about a 250-patient cohort, reported that the application of tumescent liposuction, as the sole reduction-mammoplasty procedure, yielded consistent results wherein none of the patients had loose breast-skin envelopes, irregular breast-shape, permanent loss of sensation (either glandular, dermal, or of the NAC), scars, tissue necrosis, or infection.

After fat cells are suctioned away via liposuction, it was quoted in the Obesity journal that overall body fat generally returned to the same level as before treatment, despite maintaining the previous diet and exercise regimen. While the fat returned somewhat to the treated area, most of the increased fat occurred in the abdominal area. Visceral fat - the fat surrounding the internal organs - increased, and this condition has been linked to life-shortening diseases such as diabetes, stroke, and heart attack.

==== Indications ====
The reduction of oversized breasts by liposuction only (lipectomy) is indicated when a minor-to-moderate volume-reduction is required, and there is no breast ptosis to correct. However, in a 2001 study of 250 patients, nipple and breast elevation of between 3 cm and 15 cm was reported. Further indications for lipectomy are presented by: (i) the patient who requires a large-volume reduction, and wants un-scarred, sensate breasts, but will accept a degree of ptosis; (ii) the patient who requires a secondary mammoplasty to correct an asymmetric breast, by up to one brassière cup-size; and (iii) the patient affected by juvenile breast hypertrophy, as a temporary procedure performed before the conclusion of thelarche (the pubertal breast-growth phase), given the hypertrophy's high rate of recurrence.

==== Contraindications ====
Breast reduction by liposuction only cannot be performed upon a patient whose mammogram indicates that the oversized breast is principally composed of hypertrophied milk glands. Furthermore, liposuction mammoplasty also is contraindicated for any patient whose mammograms indicate the presence of unevaluated neoplasms; likewise, the presence of a great degree of breast ptosis, and an inelastic skin envelope.

==== Pre-operative matters ====
Consultation: the plastic surgeon evaluates the elasticity of the skin envelope of each breast, and determines the degree of breast ptosis present. The patient is informed of the alternative, surgical reduction techniques available for diminishing oversized breasts; of the consequent surgical scars; of the possible loss of breast sensation; of the possible impairment of lactation capability; and of the possible impairment of breast-feeding functions. The patient is further informed of the possible medical complications, and is shown surgical photographic records of the average outcomes of breast-reduction surgery. The surgeon answers the patient's questions to assist in establishing realistic expectations (self-image) about the breast-reduction outcome possible with a lipectomy procedure; and that, should lipectomy not satisfactorily reduce the breast volume, a secondary, surgical breast-reduction procedure can be performed later.

The measures of the bust: a liposuction mammoplasty procedure does not feature a surgical-incision plan delineated upon the patient's breasts, chest, and torso, but the measures of the bust are established in order to determine the required degree(s) of correction; thus, with the patient sitting erect, for each breast, the surgeon records the jugular-notch-to-nipple distances, the nipple-to-inframammary-fold distances, and any asymmetries. Afterwards, the anaesthetized patient is laid supine upon the operating table, arms laterally extended (abducted), in order to fully expose the breasts.

Anaesthestic preparation: to limit bleeding during the liposuction, the proper degree of vasoconstriction of the breast's circulatory system is established with an anaesthetic solution (lidocaine + epinephrine in saline solution) that is infiltrated to the deep and the superficial plains of each breast. Using a blunt-tip, multi-perforation cannula, the anaesthetic infiltration begins at the deep plane of the breast, and continues as the cannula is withdrawn towards the superficial plane of the breast. The entire area of the breast is infiltrated with the anaesthetic solution until the tissues become tumescent (firm). Moreover, as required by the patient's physique, an intravenous (IV) pressure bag can be applied to hasten the infiltration; after the anaesthetic has numbed the breast, the plastic surgeon begins the lipectomy breast-reduction.

==== Operative technique ====
The surgeon effects a stab incision just above the lateral aspect of the inframammary fold (IMF), piercing the skin 2-cm above the inframammary fold, in the midline. The pre-tunnelling is performed with the blunt-tip, multi-perforation cannula used to infiltrate the anaesthetic solution to the breast tissues. A blunt-tip, 4-mm cannula, connected either to a medical-grade vacuum pump or to a syringe, is used to aspirate the adipose fat. The cannula is maneuvered laterally (in fanning movements), beginning in the deep plane of the breast and concluding in the superficial plane of the breast; the adipose fat sucked from the breast is a yellow, fatty, bloodless fluid; the liposuction concludes upon drawing the required volume of fat, or when the fat becomes bloody.

After the liposuction, the superficial layer of adipose fat is undermined with a blunt-tip, 3-mm cannula (which is not connected to a vacuum pump). The breast ptosis is corrected by stimulating the controlled retraction of the incision scar, by undermining the superficial fat of the medial and the lateral upper areas of the breast; the maneuver tightens (retracts) the skin envelope of the breast. Procedurally, the liposuction-only breast reduction procedure concludes with the application of an elastic, foam-tape dressing that molds the reduced breast into its new shape, and lifts it higher upon the chest.

Technical note: for the reduction of very enlarged breasts, the plastic surgeon makes a supplementary incision just above the medial aspect of the inframammary fold. Procedurally, the placement of this incision later allows converting the lipectomy breast-reduction procedure into an inferior-pedicle breast reduction surgery, if liposuction proved inadequate to satisfactorily reducing the volume of the very enlarged breasts.

==== Convalescence ====
The patient is discharged from hospital either the same day or the day after the breast reduction operation. Because the liposuction-only procedure featured only a few, small, surgical incisions, the patient quickly recovers their health, usually resuming daily life activities at 14 to 28 days post-operative – when the breast-molding dressings are changed; the patient also resumes their personal hygiene regimen, to include washing under a water shower. In the initial convalescence period, the surgical-incision wounds are inspected at 1-week post-operative, during which time the patient has continuously worn a strapless brassière to contain and immobilize the corrected breasts; afterwards, the patient continuously wears a strapped brassière for 30 days after the breast-reduction operation.

==== Complications ====
Early complications include infection and hematoma (blood outside the vascular system); late complications include an unsatisfactory breast-volume reduction that might require either surgical or liposuction revision. As with other liposuction procedures, the final result of a liposuction-only breast reduction becomes evident at 6-months post-operative; although the edema usually subsides at 2–3 weeks post-operative. To date, no incidence of tissue necrosis has been reported; likewise, there have been few reports of lessened nipple sensation. Generally, the long-term rate of patient-satisfaction is high, provided that the indications for the liposuction-only technique are abided with proper patient selection.
