= Intermammary cleft =

Breast cleavage

Details

Identifiers
- Latin: sulcus intermammarius
- TA98: A16.0.02.002
- TA2: 7110
- FMA: 55264

The intermammary cleft, intermammary sulcus, or sulcus intermammarius is a surface feature of males and females that marks the division of the two breasts with the sternum (breastbone) in the middle. The International Federation of Associations of Anatomists (IFAA) uses the terms "sulcus intermammarius" or "intermammary cleft" when referring to the area between the breasts.

== Etymology ==
"Intermammary" ("inter", between + "mamma", breasts + "ry", place) means something that is located or performed between the breasts (example: intermammary intercourse). "Sulcus" is a Latin word that means a furrow or groove, commonly used to mean a fold, fissure or furrow of the brain (example: lateral sulcus). In popular usage the area is commonly referred to as a cleavage of breasts. In surgical parlance, the cleavage or intermammary cleft is also known as the "medial definition" or "medial fold" of breasts. An imaginary line between the nipples that crosses the intermammary cleft, serving as a landmark for some CPR procedures, is known as the "intermammary line".

== Anatomy ==
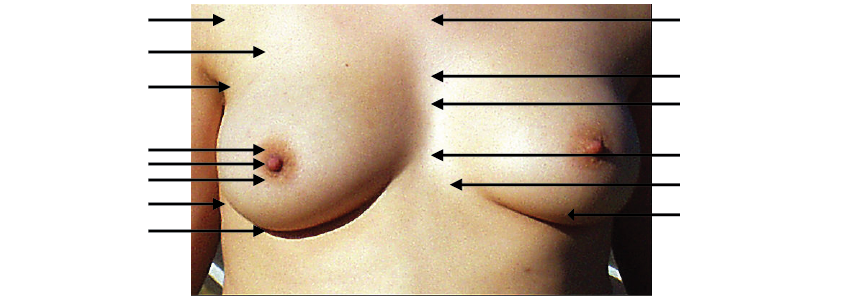
Superficial anatomy of human female breast

=== Skin ===
At the midline of the breast—the intermammary cleft—a deep layer of superficial fascia (lowermost layer of the skin) is firmly attached to the pectoral fascia (outer side of chest muscles) and the periosteum (bone membrane) of the sternum. It forms a shelving edge that supports the breasts.

=== Muscles ===
The sternalis muscle is an anatomical variation that lies in front of the sternal end of the pectoralis major runs along the anterior aspect of the body of the sternum. The sternalis muscle often originates from the upper part of the sternum and can display varying insertions such as the pectoral fascia, lower ribs, costal cartilages, rectus sheath, aponeurosis of the abdominal external oblique muscle. There is still a great deal of disagreement about its innervation and its embryonic origin. The sternal side (towards the breastbone) of the pectoralis major is distinct from the clavicular side (towards the collarbone), and the two are separated by a fascial interval. The sternal side is usually more robust and has a fiber orientation that best emulates the downward pull of the subscapularis muscle (armpit muscle).

=== Ligaments ===
A dense structure of Cooper's ligaments is medially inserted into the skin overlying the sternum, determining the shape of the breasts and intermammary sulcus. These ligaments helpful in supporting the breasts in a youthful disposition; loss of elasticity or attenuation of these ligaments results in ptosis (sagging) of breasts.

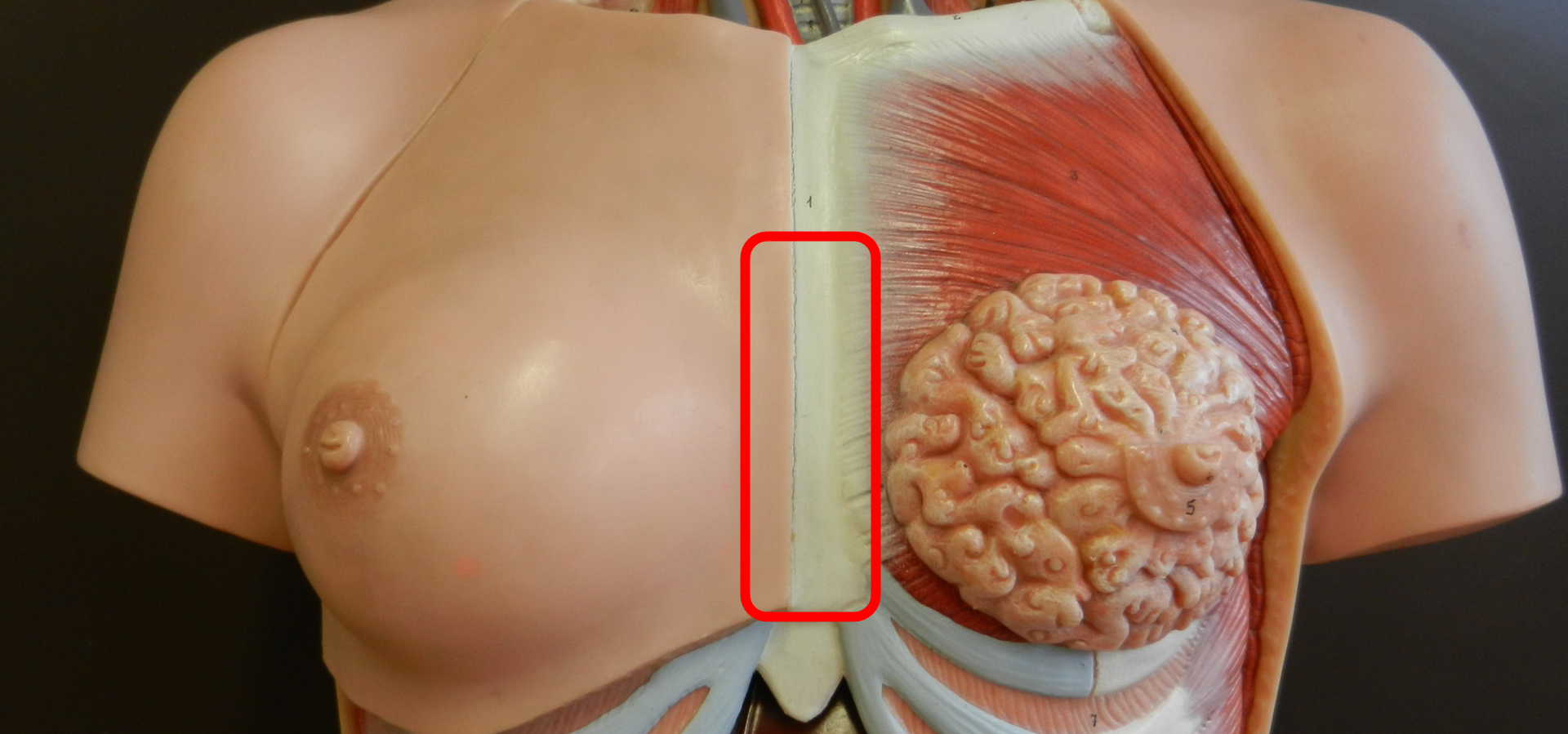
Anatomy of the cleavage, the red outlined area being the intermammary cleft

=== Arteries ===
Major blood supply in the area happens through the intermammary artery (also known as the internal thoracic artery) in the thoracic cavity. Among women, this artery is larger. From which anterior perforating branches carry blood into the circummammary arterial plexus, a vascular network formed by branches between minute arteries around the breasts, with lateral mammary branches curving around the lateral border of the pectoralis major.

=== Lymphs ===
Lymph vessels originating at the base of the nipples can ventrally extend as far as the intermammary cleft and to the opposite breast. The intermammary lymphatics begin as a bunch of small channels consisting of a single layer of epithelium that is supported by stroma tissues. Each mesh of this network surrounds one or more of the ultimate lobules of the glands and receives its lymph from the interacinous spaces between the acini of glands.

=== Nerves ===
The first intercostal nerve, a tiny branch (ramus) of the anterior division of the first thoracic nerve, runs along the first intercostal space (the lower margin of the first rib), travels towards the sternum to innervate the skin near the midline, and, as the first anterior cutaneous (skin) branch of the thorax, ends on the front of the chest. The nerve supply to sternalis muscles comes from the right third intercostal nerve through its anterior cutaneous branch.

== Clinical conditions ==
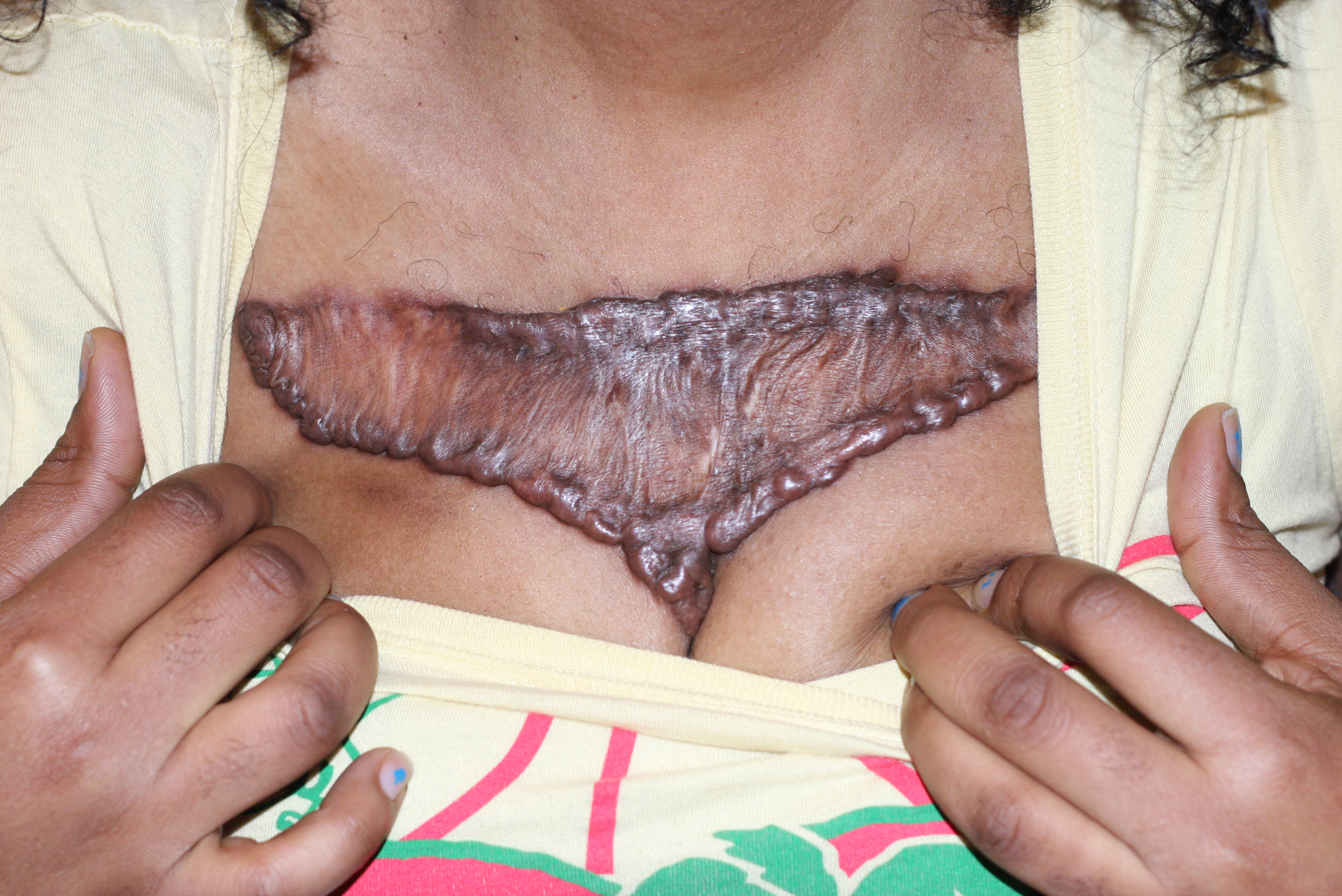
Painful, inflammatory keloid of the chest wall

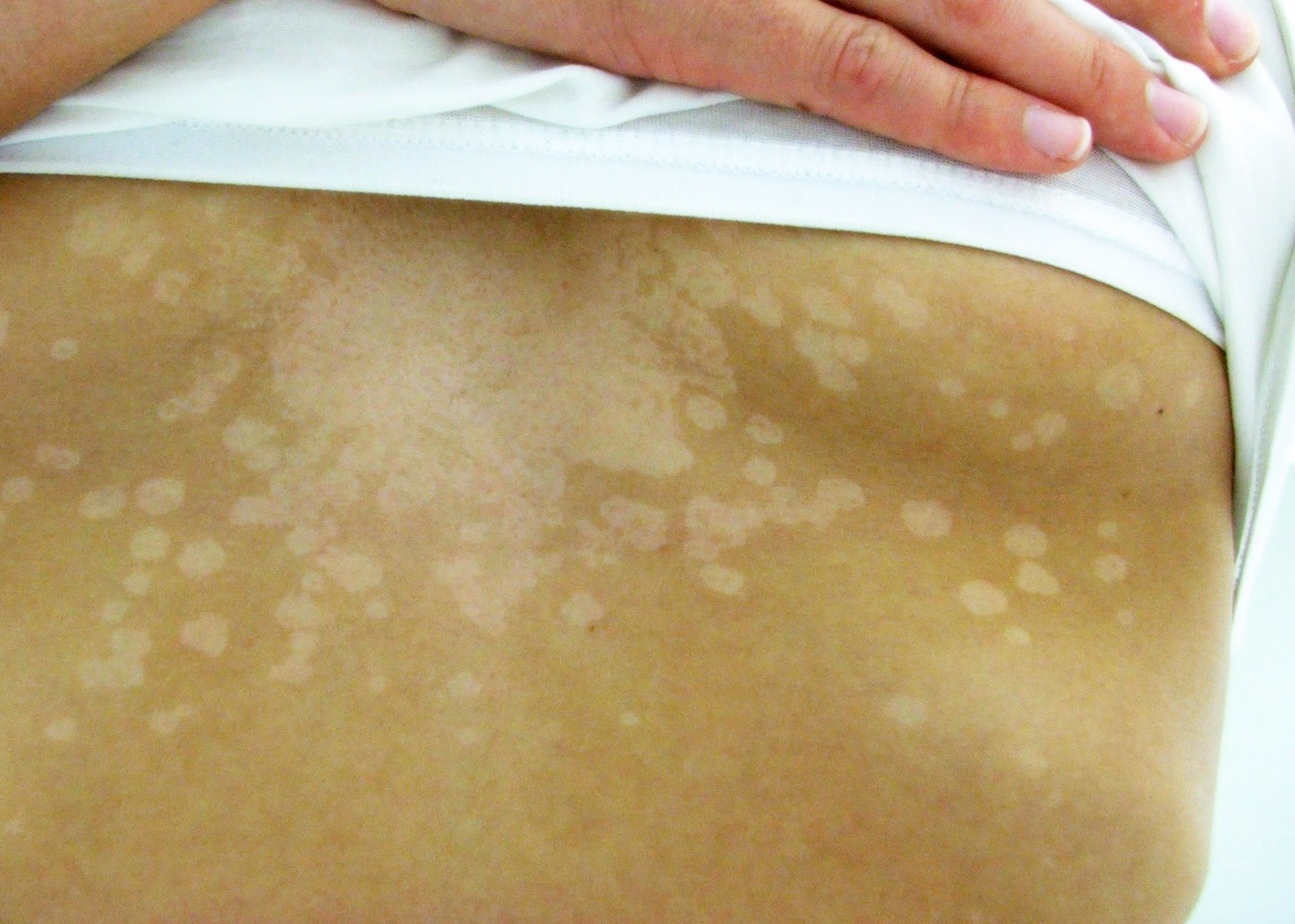
Pale coin sized eruptions of tinea versicolor on torso

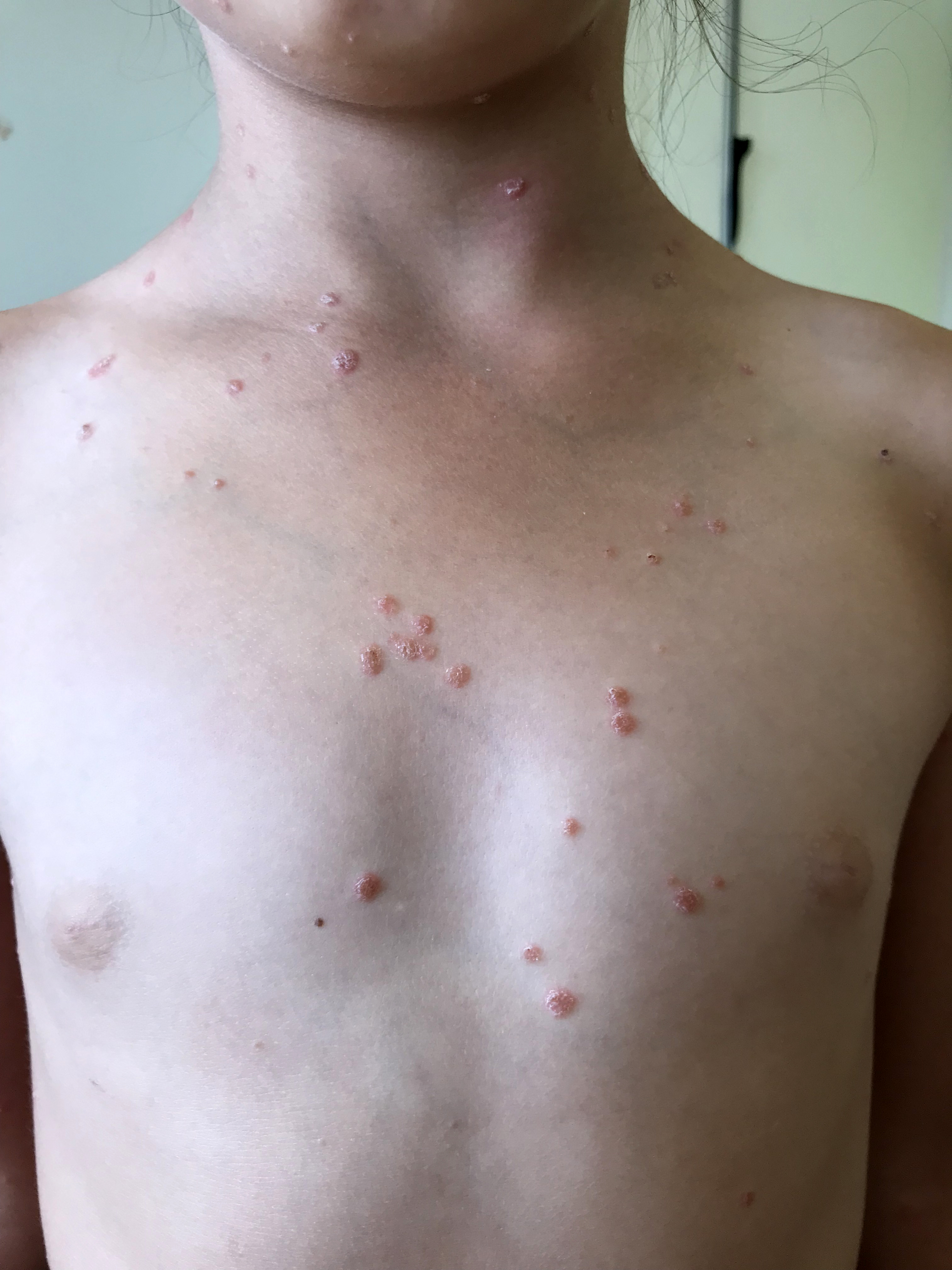
Psoriasis across chest

=== Poikiloderma of Civatte ===
Poikiloderma of Civatte, a condition of dilated blood vessels and red to red-brown spots, is common to upper part of the cleavage, especially for those who wear sports bras or push-up bras for prolonged periods, and commonly affects fair skinned middle-aged to elderly women. It is characterized by hypopigmentation, hyperpigmentation, telangiectasias and superficial skin atrophy (occasional itching is reported), is another condition caused by long exposure to sunlight. Poikiloderma and dermatoheliosis are treated by desquamation (skin peeling).

=== Hidradenitis suppurativa ===
Hidradenitis suppurativa (HS) is a non-contagious chronic skin disease affects intertriginous skin of apocrine sweat gland bearing areas like inframammary fold, and intermammary sulcus. It is characterized by clusters of abscesses, epidermoid cysts, sebaceous cysts, pilonidal cysts. There is no single effective treatment for HS. The recommended treatments include antibiotics, antiandrogens, corticosteroids, ciclosporins, and TNF inhibitors.

=== Tinea versicolor ===
Tinea versicolor is a condition characterized by pinhead to coin sized eruptions on the body trunk and proximal extremities, often affecting the breast cleavage as a narrow band of lesions. The majority of tinea versicolor is caused by the fungus Malassezia globosa, although Malassezia furfur is responsible for a small number of cases. Topical antifungal medications containing selenium sulfide are often recommended to treat tinea versicolor.

=== Psoriasis ===
Intermammary cleft can get attacked by plaque type psoriasis, which can in turn can cause erythematosus. Prurigo pigmentosa is a rare skin condition of unknown cause that affects depressed places on chest and back like the intermammary area. It is characterized by the sudden onset of erythematous papules that leave a reticulated hyperpigmentation when they heal. Confluent and reticulated papillomatosis, characterized by asymptomatic, small, red to brown, slightly verrucous papules occurs on upper torso, the cleavage area and back. Granular parakeratosis, though mostly an ailment of the armpit area, is also found on the cleavage.

=== Hirsutism ===
Most women have an increase of hair as they grow older, but some gets more hair on their cleavage, face and elsewhere because of hirsutism, often as a result of polyendocrine metabolic ovarian syndrome (PMOS). The hair on the cleavage is upsetting for many women. There are two ways to remove the hair — temporary (i.e. shaving, waxing, plucking, hair removal creams or bleaching) and permanent (electrolysis or laser hair removal). Contraceptive pills also help.

=== Symmastia ===
Symmastia is a condition defined as a confluence of the breast tissue of both breasts across the intermammary cleft that normally divides them. It can be surgically corrected by a plastic surgeon through symmastia revision. Symmastia can either be a congenital anomaly or iatrogenic. Congenital symmastia is a rare condition with few published cases. Iatrogenic symmastia may occur following breast augmentation, forming what is also colloquially referred to as a "uniboob" or "breadloafing" as a result of the release of skin and muscle tissue around the sternum due to over-dissection.

== In alternative medicine ==
The mandala (diagram) for anahata chakra, the yogic heart that lies at the depression on the sternum between the nipples

The cleavage area is special in Ayurvedic and Yogic philosophy as the fourth chakra' or anahata chakra (अनाहत meaning "unstruck" in Sanskrit, the heart chakra) supposedly lies at the level of the depression in the sternum. The astral anahata chakra supposedly lies between the breasts, just inside the front of the chest level with the nipples. According to Yogashikha Upanishad, the sacred text on yoga, 101 nadis (energy channels) connect the anahata chakra with the rest of the body, including ida, pingala and shushumna, the three major nadis.

According to yoga philosophy, the kundalini shakti (the feminine energy) rises from the muladhara chakra (root chakra) in the pelvic area to reach the cleavage area, a fundamental center for growth of a human being, where at the anahata chakra it is expressed as love, hate and fear. In the cleavage area, according to yoga philosophy, lies the yogic heart of a person, not the heart of flesh, that serves as the bridge between the three lower chakras and the three higher chakras, and when the kundalini remains in the Anahata Chakra, a person is inclined to good and noble desires, thoughts and acts.

According to Traditional Chinese medicine (TCM), shan zhong (Ren-17, 膻中; dan jung, 단중 in Korean) is the acupoint that lies at the intersection of the mid sternal line and a line connecting the nipples. The name shan zhong refers to its location at the center of the chest, seated on an "altar" (i.e. the sternum ) or a "place of worship". It was described by Lingshu Jing, the Divine Pivot as the location of the pericardium. It also is the focal point for regulate the flow of qi, the vital force of any living entity, in the entire body, especially in the chest and breasts. It also helps to provide emotional relief and calm the spirit.

== See also ==
- Gynecomastia
