= Pencil test =

Pencil test may refer to:

- Pencil test, a British version of drawing straws
- Pencil test (animation), an early version of an animated scene
- Pencil test (breasts), an informal test to determine if a girl needs to wear a bra
- Pencil Test (film), a 1988 animated short by Apple Inc.
- Pencil test (South Africa), a test to determine racial identity during apartheid
