= Laurence Kirwan =

Laurence Kirwan may refer to:

- Laurence P. Kirwan (1907–1999), British archaeologist
- Laurence A. Kirwan (born 1952), British plastic surgeon
