= Symmastia =

Connection of tissue between both breasts

Symmastia is a condition defined as a confluence of the breast tissue of both breasts across the intermammary cleft that normally divides them. It can be surgically corrected by a plastic surgeon through symmastia revision.

Symmastia can either be a congenital anomaly or iatrogenic. Congenital symmastia is a rare condition with few published cases. Iatrogenic symmastia may occur following breast augmentation, forming what is also colloquially referred to as a "uniboob" or "breadloafing" as a result of the release of skin and muscle tissue around the sternum due to over-dissection.

== Symptoms ==
The symptoms of symmastia include a unibrow-like appearance of the breasts, a lack of cleavage, and a visible gap between the breasts .

In addition to these physical symptoms, patients with symmastia may also experience discomfort or pain in the affected area. This is because the condition can put pressure on the underlying tissues and nerves, causing irritation and inflammation. In severe cases, symmastia can also cause difficulty breathing or other respiratory problems.

Diagnosing symmastia typically involves a physical examination by a qualified plastic surgeon. During this examination, the surgeon will look for signs of skin and tissue damage between the breasts, as well as any other abnormalities that may be contributing to the condition. In some cases, imaging tests such as MRI or CT scans may also be used to get a more detailed view of the affected area.

== Causes ==
One of the most significant causes of symmastia is improper surgical technique. According to a study published in the Aesthetic Surgery Journal, inadequate dissection of the implant pocket can result in medial displacement of the implants, leading to symmastia. Similarly, over-dissection of the pocket can weaken the medial breast tissue and cause implant migration towards the midline, resulting in symmastia.

Implant size and placement are also important factors that can contribute to symmastia. Larger implants have a higher risk of causing symmastia due to their increased weight and volume. Additionally, subglandular placement of implants (above the muscle) has been associated with a higher incidence of symmastia compared to submuscular placement.

Tissue quality is another factor that can affect the development of symmastia. Patients with thin or weak breast tissue are at a higher risk of developing symmastia due to their reduced ability to support the implants. Similarly, patients who have undergone previous breast surgeries may have compromised tissue quality, increasing their risk for symmastia.

Patient factors such as genetics and body habitus may also play a role in the development of symmastia. Patients with a wide sternum or narrow chest wall may be predisposed to developing symmastia due to their anatomy.

== Treatments ==
One of the most common treatments for symmastia is surgical correction. According to a study published in the Aesthetic Surgery Journal, surgical correction involves creating a new pocket for the implant(s) and using sutures or mesh to reinforce the tissue and prevent the implants from migrating towards the center of the chest. The study found that this procedure had a success rate of over 90% and resulted in significant improvements in patients' satisfaction with their appearance and quality of life.

Another option for treating symmastia is non-surgical correction using compression garments or specialized bras. According to an article published in Plastic Surgical Nursing, these garments can help redistribute the breast tissue and support the implants in their proper position. However, this approach may not be effective for all cases of symmastia and may only provide temporary relief.

In some cases, a combination of surgical and non-surgical approaches may be necessary to achieve optimal results. For example, a study published in Plastic and Reconstructive Surgery Global Open described a technique called "Neopectoral Pocket" that involves using sutures to create a new pocket for the implant(s) while also using compression garments to provide additional support during the healing process.

== Prevention ==
One way to prevent symmastia is by using appropriate implant placement techniques. According to the book Breast Augmentation by William P. Adams Jr., et al., submuscular implant placement can help prevent symmastia. This technique involves placing the implant under the chest muscle, which provides additional support and coverage for the implant. Additionally, using a dual plane technique, where the implant is partially placed under the muscle and partially under the breast tissue, can also help prevent symmastia.

Another important factor in preventing symmastia is proper sizing and positioning of the implants. The book Aesthetic Plastic Surgery by Sherrell J. Aston and Douglas S. Steinbrech notes that using appropriately sized implants that fit the patient's anatomy can help prevent symmastia. Additionally, ensuring that the implants are positioned correctly and symmetrically can also help prevent this complication.

In some cases, using a supportive device such as a surgical bra or bandeau after surgery may also help prevent symmastia. The article "Prevention of Symmastia Following Breast Augmentation" published in Aesthetic Surgery Journal suggests that using a supportive device for several weeks after surgery can help prevent excessive pressure on the midline of the chest, which can contribute to symmastia.

Proper surgical technique is also critical in preventing symmastia. The article "Symmastia: Prevention, Recognition, and Treatment" published in Plastic and Reconstructive Surgery notes that avoiding excessive dissection of the breast tissue and using appropriate suture techniques can help prevent symmastia. Additionally, avoiding over-dissection of the medial pocket and using appropriate tissue coverage can also help prevent this complication.
