= Pencil test (breasts) =

Informal test of breast development

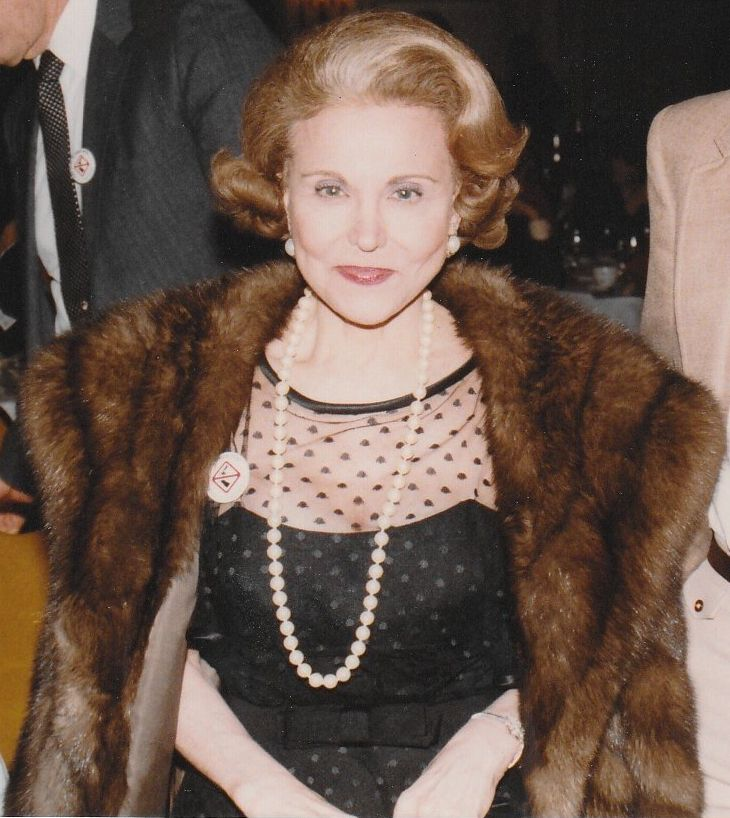
Ann Landers in Chicago in 1983

The pencil test is an informal test of breast development and the need to wear a bra. It was published in a 1971 advice column by Ann Landers mostly containing reader responses, pro and anti-bra, to her recent column "berating the braless female who shamelessly bounced and flopped and went shopping ... [which for Landers] created a deluge of mail". One Chicago correspondent chimed in:

The question "to bra or not to bra" can be easily answered if the undecided woman will apply this test to herself. Take an ordinary woodcase pencil. Put it under one breast. If the pencil stays there you should wear a bra. If it falls, you can go braless.

— One Who Flunked

The implication is that breasts that are not pendulous enough to trap a pencil are self-supporting and do not need the added support of a bra.

== Social implications ==
Some girls see the ability of their breast holding a pencil (or even a box of cereal) as a sign that they are finally a grown-up woman.

No evidence has been offered as to its validity, but some people consider it a method to determine whether a young girl should begin wearing a bra. The theory is that if the girl places a pencil under her breast and it stays in place, then wearing a bra is recommended; if it falls to the ground, a bra is not yet needed. Other factors when choosing whether to wear a bra include physical support of very large breasts, pain when exercising, and general comfort.

== Breast sagging ==
Some women use the pencil test to determine if their breasts are sagging. However, some degree of ptosis is normal and natural. Sagging is partly determined by inherited traits like skin elasticity and breast density, which affects the ratio of lightweight fat to heavier mammary glands. Some sagging is due to the aging of the glandular tissues that produce breast firmness. The public and the medical community define sagging differently. Plastic surgeons categorize the severity of ptosis by evaluating the position of the nipple relative to the inframammary fold. They don't consider a woman's breasts to be sagging unless the nipple is positioned below the inframammary fold. In the most advanced stage, the nipples are below the fold and point towards the ground.

Wearing a bra does not prevent breasts from sagging. Many women, in the mistaken belief that breasts cannot anatomically support themselves, think that wearing a bra will prevent their breasts from sagging later in life. Researchers, bra manufacturers, and health professionals cannot find any evidence to support the idea that wearing a bra for any amount of time slows breast ptosis. Bra manufacturers are careful to claim that bras only affect the shape of breasts while they are being worn.

== In popular culture ==
In 1975, the student senate of the University of Texas at Austin passed a dress code that among other things made it mandatory for women to wear a bra if they could not pass the pencil test. The decision was filibustered by a female senate member, and she was physically removed from the room before the vote passed 11–9.
