= Diffraction tomography =

Diffraction tomography is an inverse scattering technique used to find the shape of a scattering object by illuminating it with probing waves and recording the reflections. It is based on the diffraction slice theorem and assumes that the scatterer is weak. It is closely related to X-ray tomography.
