= Ptosis (breasts) =

Sagging of the female breast

Breast ptosis
- Other names: Cooper's droop
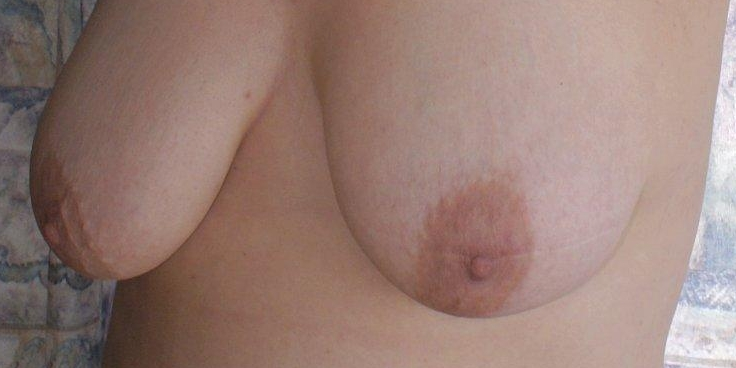
- Specialty: Plastic surgery
- Treatment: Mastopexy

Ptosis or sagging of the female breast is a natural consequence of aging. The rate at which a woman's breasts drop and the degree of ptosis depends on many factors. The key factors influencing breast ptosis over a woman's lifetime are cigarette smoking, her number of pregnancies, higher body mass index, larger bra cup size, and significant weight change. Post-menopausal women or people with collagen deficiencies may experience increased ptosis due to a loss of skin elasticity. Many women and medical professionals mistakenly believe that breastfeeding increases sagging. It is also commonly believed that the breast itself offers insufficient support and that wearing a bra prevents sagging, which has not been found to be true.

Plastic surgeons categorize the degree of ptosis by evaluating the position of the nipple relative to the infra-mammary fold, the point at which the underside of the breasts attach to the chest wall. In the most advanced stage, the nipples are below the fold and point toward the ground. Women's breasts undergo changes in size, volume, and position throughout their lives. In young women with large breasts—or even breast hypertrophy—sagging can occur early on due to the effects of gravity. The primary cause is often a disproportion between breast volume/weight and body size.

== Signs and symptoms ==
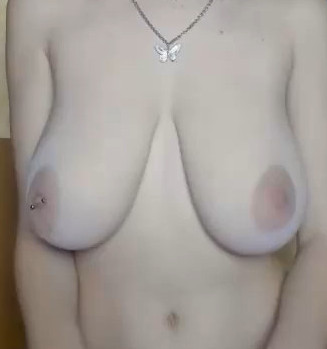
Ptosis of the breasts may occur at a young age due to large breast size or smoking

A woman's breasts change in size, volume, and position on her chest throughout her life. In young women with large breasts, sagging may occur early in life due to the effect of gravity. It may be primarily caused by the volume and weight of the breasts which are disproportionate to her body size.

=== Impact of pregnancy ===
During pregnancy, the ovaries and the placenta produce estrogen and progesterone. These hormones stimulate the 15 to 20 lobes of the milk-secreting glands in the breasts to develop. Women who experience multiple pregnancies repeatedly stretch the skin envelope during engorgement while lactating. As a woman's breasts change in size during repeated pregnancies, the size of her breasts change as her mammary glands are engorged with milk and as she gains and loses weight with each pregnancy. In addition, when milk production stops (usually as a child is weaned), the voluminous mammary glands diminish in volume, but they still add bulk and firmness to the breast. A 2010 review found that weight gain during pregnancy and breastfeeding were not significant risk factors for ptosis.

=== Middle-aged women ===
In middle-aged women, breast ptosis is caused by a combination of factors. If a woman has been pregnant, hormonal changes during the postpartum period will cause her depleted milk glands to atrophy. Breast tissue and suspensory ligaments may also be stretched if the woman is overweight or loses and gains weight. When these factors are at play, the breast prolapses, or falls forward. When a woman with sagging breasts stands, the underside or inferior skin of the breast folds over the infra-mammary fold and lies against the chest wall. The nipple-areola complex tends to move lower on the breast relative to the inframammary crease. The nipple of the breast may also tend to point downward.

=== Post-menopausal women ===
In post-menopausal women, breast atrophy is aggravated by the inelasticity of over-stretched, aged skin. This is due in part to the reduction in estrogen, which affects all body tissues, including breast tissue. The loss of estrogen reduces breast size and fullness. Estrogen is also essential to maintaining a fibrous protein called collagen, which makes up much of the breast's connective tissue.

=== Ptosis scale ===
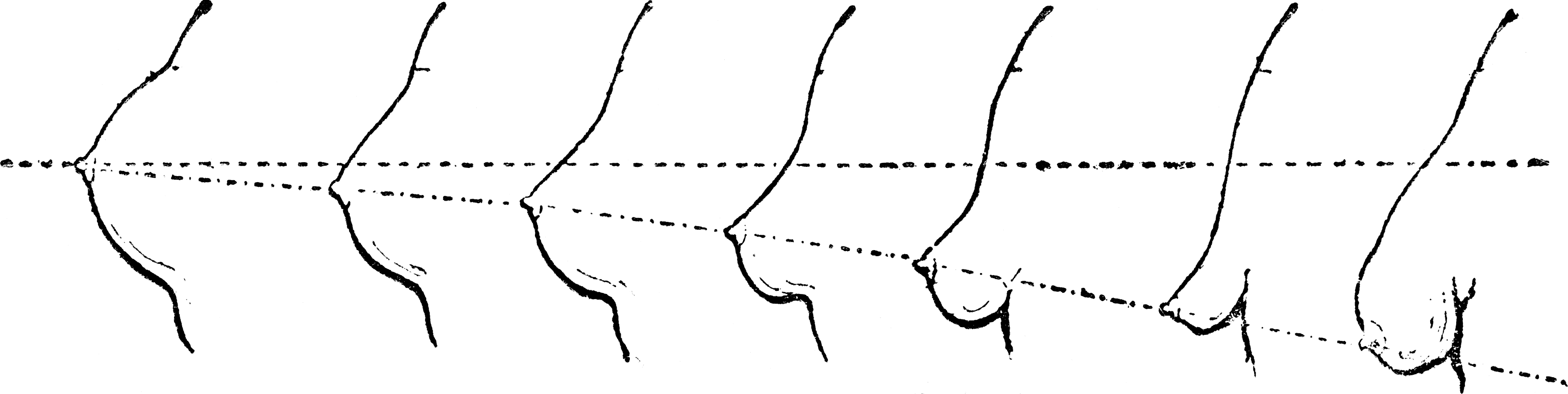
Stages of ptosis

Plastic surgeons describe the degree of breast sagging using a ptosis scale like the modified Regnault ptosis scale below:

- Grade I: Mild ptosis—The nipple is at the level of the inframammary fold and above most of the lower breast tissue.
- Grade II: Moderate ptosis—The nipple is located below the infra-mammary fold but higher than most of the breast tissue hangs.
- Grade III: Advanced ptosis—The nipple is below the inframammary fold and at the level of maximum breast projection.
- Pseudoptosis—The nipple is located either at or above the infra-mammary fold, while the lower half of the breast sags below the fold. This is most often seen when a woman stops nursing, as her milk glands atrophy, causing her breast tissue to sag.
- Parenchymal Maldistribution—The lower breast tissue is lacking fullness, the inframammary fold is very high, and the nipple and areola are relatively close to the fold. This is usually a developmental deformity.

== Causes ==
University of Kentucky plastic surgeon Brian Rinker encountered many women in his practice who attributed their sagging breasts to breastfeeding, which was also the usual belief among medical practitioners. He decided to find out if this was true, and between 1998 and 2006 he and other researchers interviewed 132 women who were seeking breast augmentation or breast lifts. They studied the women's medical history, body mass index (BMI), their number of pregnancies, their breast cup size before pregnancy, and smoking status. The study results were presented in 2008 at a conference of the American Society of Plastic Surgeons.

According to Rinker's research, there are several key factors. A history of cigarette smoking "breaks down a protein in the skin called elastin, which gives youthful skin its elastic appearance and supports the breast." The number of pregnancies was strongly correlated with ptosis, with the effects increasing with each pregnancy. As most women age, breasts naturally yield to gravity and tend to sag and fold over the inframammary crease, the lower attachment point to the chest wall. This is more true for larger-breasted women. The fourth reason was significant weight gain or loss (greater than 50 pounds (23 kg)). Other significant factors were higher body mass index and larger bra cup size.

In Rinker's study, 55% of respondents reported an adverse change in breast shape after pregnancy. Many women mistakenly attribute the changes and their sagging breasts to breastfeeding, and as a result some are reluctant to nurse their infants. Research shows that breastfeeding is not the factor that many thought it was. Rinker concluded that "breastfeeding does not appear to have an adverse effect upon breast appearance." Also discounted as causes affecting ptosis are weight gain during pregnancy and lack of participation in regular upper body exercise.

=== Effect of vigorous exercise ===
When running, breasts may move three-dimensionally: vertically, horizontally and laterally, in an overall figure-8 motion. Unrestrained movement of large breasts may contribute to sagging over time. Motion studies have revealed that when a woman runs, more than 50% of the breast's total movement is vertical, 22% is side-to-side, and 27% is in-and-out. A 2007 study of sports bras found that the encapsulation type, in which each cup is separately molded, are more effective than the compression type, which press the breasts close to the body, at reducing total breast motion during exercise. Encapsulation bras reduce motion in two of the three planes, while compression bras reduce motion in only one plane. Previously, it was commonly believed that a woman with small- to medium-size breasts benefited most from a compression-type sports bra, and women with larger breasts needed an encapsulation-type sports bra.

== Mechanism ==
Anatomically, breasts do not contain any muscle but are composed of soft, glandular tissue. Breasts are composed of mammary glands, milk ducts, adipose tissue (fat tissue) and Cooper's ligaments.

Mammary glands remain relatively constant throughout life. Fat tissue surrounds the mammary glands, and its volume will normally vary throughout life. Although the exact mechanisms that determine breast shape and size are largely unknown, the amount and distribution of fat tissue and, to a lesser extent, mammary tissue, cause variations in breast size, shape and volume. Some experts believe Cooper's ligaments, which are connective tissue within the breast, provide some structural support, but there is no agreement on whether they provide support or simply divide breast tissue into compartments.

== Treatment ==
=== Bras ===
Since breasts are an external organ and do not contain muscle, exercise cannot improve their shape. They are not protected from external forces and are subject to gravity. Many women mistakenly believe that breasts cannot anatomically support themselves and that wearing a brassiere will prevent their breasts from sagging later in life. Researchers, bra manufacturers, and health professionals have not found any evidence to support the idea that wearing a bra for any amount of time slows breast ptosis. Bra manufacturers are careful to claim that bras only affect the shape of breasts while they are being worn.

There is some evidence that bra use reduces the development of Cooper's ligaments, connective tissue that supports breast shape. That atrophy from bra-wearing may therefore lead to more breast sag in the long run, much as the connective tissue in a limb weakens while it is in a cast and must be re-strengthened afterward. Studies have actually documented that, after an initial period of adjustment, women experienced a significant increase in comfort and breast firmness after forgoing bras.

=== Surgery ===
Some women with ptosis choose to undergo plastic surgery to make their breasts less ptotic. Plastic surgeons offer several procedures for lifting sagging breasts. Surgery to correct the size, contour, and elevation of sagging breasts is called mastopexy. Women can also choose breast implants, or may undergo both procedures. The breast-lift procedure surgically elevates the parenchymal tissue (breast mass), cuts and re-sizes the skin envelope, and transposes the nipple-areola complex higher upon the breast hemisphere. If sagging is present and the woman opts not to undergo mastopexy, implants are typically placed above the muscle, to fill out the breast skin and tissue. Submuscular placement can result in deformity. In these cases, the implant appears to be high on the chest, while the natural breast tissue hangs down over the implant.

== See also ==
- Pencil test (breasts)
