= Laurence A. Kirwan =

British doctor (born 1952)

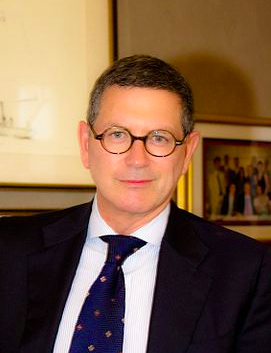
- Born: 31 March 1952 (age 74); Liverpool, United Kingdom
- Education: Victoria University of Manchester
- Scientific career
- Fields: Board certified (November 1989, valid indefinitely), Hand Surgery certified (September 1990 to December 2000), Recertified in Hand Surgery (December 2010)
- Website: http://www.drkirwan.com

Laurence Anthony Kirwan (born 31 March 1952 in Liverpool) is a British doctor.

== Education and career ==
Kirwan graduated from the Victoria University of Manchester in 1974. He is a Fellow of the Royal College of Surgeons of England since 1979, trained in General Surgery at the Maimonides Medical Center in New York (1980–1981), and was a resident at Columbia Presbyterian Medical Center in New York (1981–1982). Kirwan was a Fellow in Hand Surgery at the University of Colorado (1984–1985).

Kirwan has been indefinitely certified by the American Board of Plastic Surgery, Inc. (ASPS), he is certified in Hand Surgery (1990) and has been recertified in Hand Surgery. . He practices Aesthetic Plastic Surgery in Norwalk, Connecticut and London, England. He was quoted in a 2002 New York ared in the press for his breast reduction operations on reality television personality Ulrika Jonsson and television presenter Kim Woodburn.

Kirwan uses a so-called breast "auto augmentation" technique.

=== Charity ===
Working with AmeriCares in 1989, he organised charity surgery missions after the Spitak earthquake in Yerevan, Armenia. He organised charity surgery missions in war zones in Croatia (1993 and 1996) with UNESCO. In 1989, Kirwan became the founding director of AmeriCares' 'Doctors for All Peoples'.

=== Honors ===
The London Evening Standard, a free daily newspaper tabloid in London, named him as one of the 1000 Most Influential Londoners in 2007 and 2008. He is listed in Debrett's People of Today.

== Publications ==
=== Books ===
- Kirwan, Laurence (29 October 2004). Cutting Edge: A Top Surgeon Tells All... Artnik. ISBN 1-903906-22-9.
- Kirwan, Laurence; Fasolino, Peter (15 April 2009). My Mole Book. Artnik. ISBN 978-1905382477.
- Kirwan, Laurence (30 June 2012). Ophelia Blue Eyes: My Life So Far... Top Spot Publishing. ISBN 978-1905382491.
