= Cooper's ligaments =

Connective tissue in the breast that help maintain structural integrity

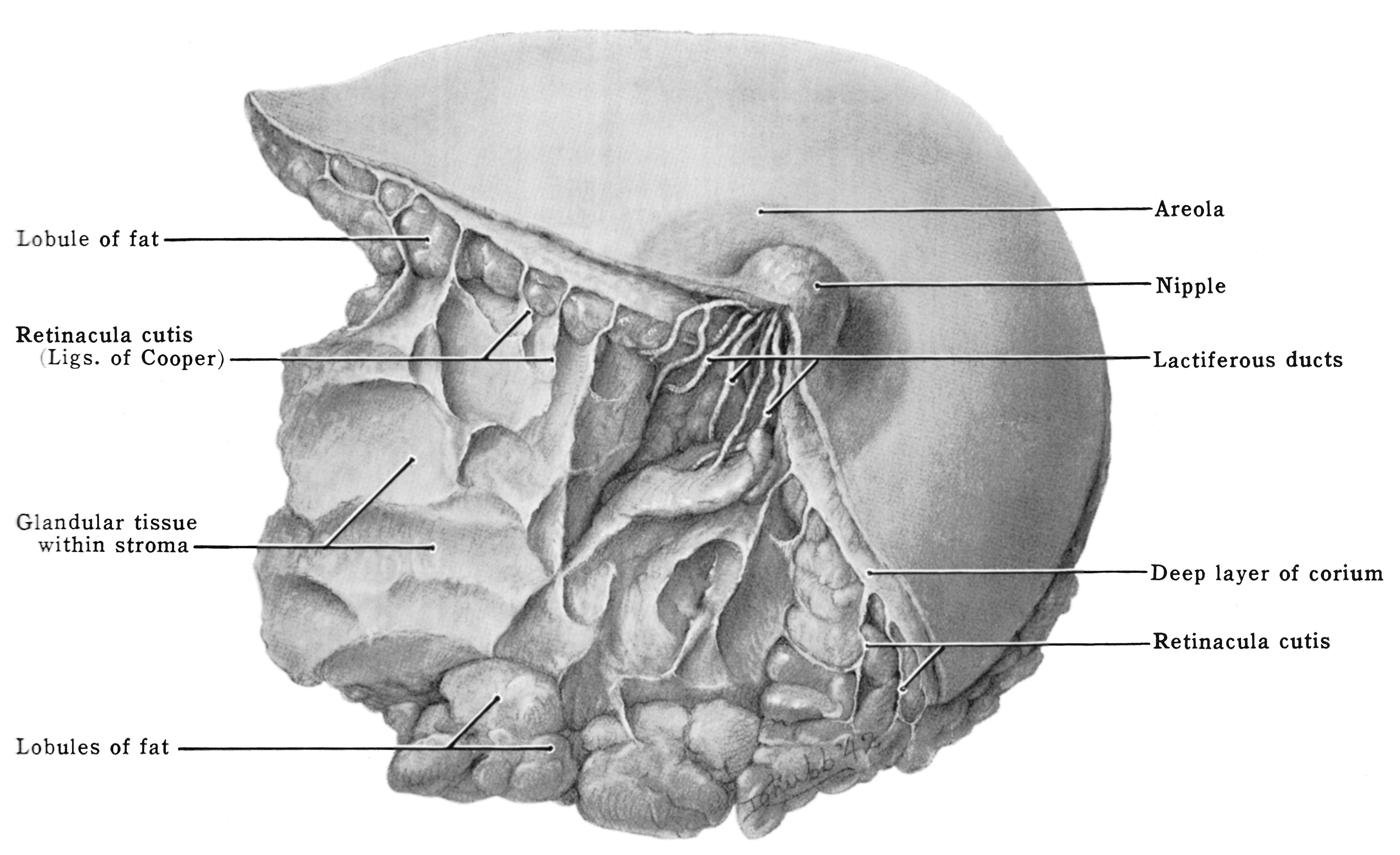
- Dissection of human breast: Cooper's ligaments labeled as "Retinacula cutis (Ligs. of Cooper)" and "Retinacula cutis"

Details

Identifiers
- Latin: retinaculum cutis mammae, ligamenta suspensoria mammaria
- TA98: A16.0.02.015
- TA2: 7109
- FMA: 71433

Cooper's ligaments (also known as the suspensory ligaments of Cooper and the fibrocollagenous septa) are connective tissue in the breast that help maintain structural integrity. They are named for Astley Cooper, who first described them in 1840. Their anatomy can be revealed using transmission diffraction tomography.

Cooper's suspensory ligament should not be confused with the pectineal ligament (sometimes called the inguinal ligament of Cooper) which shares the same eponym. Also, the intermediate fibers and/or the transverse part of the ulnar collateral ligament are sometimes called Cooper's ligament(s).

== Structure ==
The ligaments run from the clavicle and the clavipectoral fascia, branching out through and around breast tissue to the dermis of the skin overlying the breast. The intact ligament suspends the breast from the clavicle and the underlying deep fascia of the upper chest. This has the effect of supporting the breast in its normal position, and maintaining its normal shape. Without the internal support of this ligament, the breast tissue (which is heavier than the surrounding fat) sags under its own weight, losing its normal shape and contour.

== Clinical significance ==
The suspensory ligaments of Cooper play an important role in the change in appearance of the breast that often accompanies the development of inflammatory carcinoma of the breast in which blockage of the local lymphatic ducts causes swelling of the breast. Because the skin remains tethered by the suspensory ligaments of Cooper, it takes on a dimpled appearance reminiscent of the peel of an orange (peau d'orange). Carcinomas can also decrease the length of Cooper's ligaments leading to a dimpling.

== Relationship to sagging ==
Many women believe that sagging (ptosis) is caused by the failure of the Cooper's ligaments to support the breast tissue. In fact, ptosis is partly determined by genetic factors, but a review found that the biggest factors are higher body mass index, larger breast size, significant weight loss, smoking, number of pregnancies, and age.

Many women incorrectly believe that wearing a brassiere prevents their breasts from sagging later in life and that breasts cannot anatomically support themselves. But bra manufacturers have stated that because breasts are formed of fatty tissue and not muscle, bras only affect the shape of breasts while they are being worn.

Pathologically heavy breasts may cause pain in the woman's upper thoracic area, but this may be due to a poorly-fitting bra. Numerous reports state that 80–85% of women are wearing the wrong bra size.

In middle-aged women, breast ptosis is caused by a combination of factors. If the woman has had children, postpartum hormonal changes will cause the depleted milk glands to atrophy. Women who experience multiple pregnancies repeatedly stretch the skin envelope during engorgement while lactating. As a woman's breasts grow in size during repeated pregnancies, the Cooper's ligaments that maintain the position of the mammary glands against the chest are stretched and gradually lose strength. Breast tissue and suspensory ligaments may also be stretched if the woman is overweight or loses and gains weight.
