= Thoracic spinal nerve 4 =

Thoracic spinal nerve
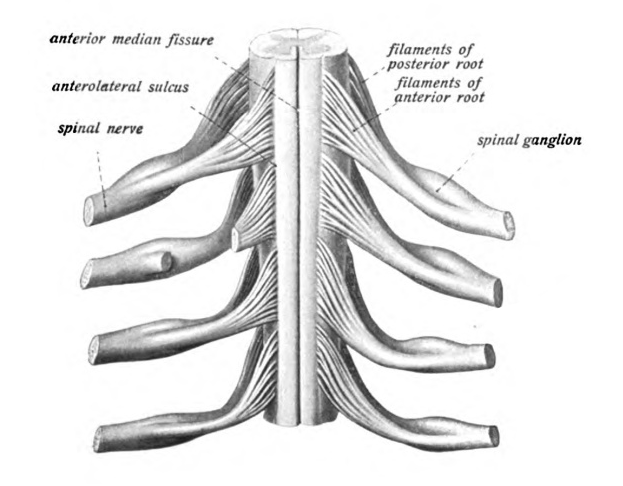
- The spinal cord with spinal nerves.

Details

Identifiers
- Latin: nervi spinalis
- FMA: 6290

The thoracic spinal nerve 4 (T4) is a spinal nerve of the thoracic segment.

It originates from the spinal column from below the thoracic vertebra 4 (T4).
