= Pectoral fascia =

Layer of connective tissue of the chest

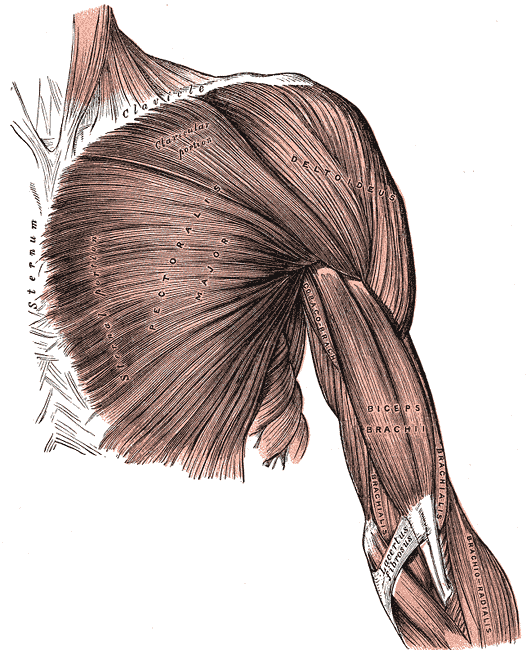
- Superficial muscles of the chest and front of the arm.

Details

Identifiers
- Latin: fascia pectoralis
- TA98: A04.4.01.017
- TA2: 2317
- FMA: 37803

The pectoral fascia is a thin lamina, covering the surface of the pectoralis major, and sending numerous prolongations between its fasciculi: it is attached, in the middle line, to the front of the sternum; above, to the clavicle; laterally and below it is continuous with the fascia of the shoulder, axilla, and thorax.

It is very thin over the upper part of the pectoralis major, but thicker in the interval between it and the latissimus dorsi, where it closes in the axillary space and forms the axillary fascia; it divides at the lateral margin of the latissimus dorsi into two layers, one of which passes in front of, and the other behind it; these proceed as far as the spinous processes of the thoracic vertebrae, to which they are attached.

As the fascia leaves the lower edge of the pectoralis major to cross the floor of the axilla it sends a layer upward under cover of the muscle; this lamina splits to envelop the pectoralis minor, at the upper edge of which it is continuous with the coracoclavicular fascia. The hollow of the armpit, seen when the arm is abducted, is produced mainly by the traction of this fascia on the axillary floor, and hence the lamina is sometimes named the suspensory ligament of the axilla.

At the lower part of the thoracic region the deep fascia is well-developed, and is continuous with the fibrous sheaths of the rectus abdominis.
