= Inframammary fold =

Natural lower boundary of the breast

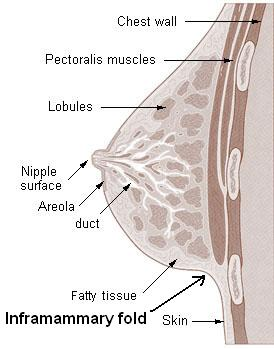
- Cross section of the breast of an adult, female human

Identifiers
- FMA: 55265 62109, 55265

In human anatomy, the inframammary fold (IMF), inframammary crease or inframammary line is the natural lower boundary of the breast; the place where the breast and the chest meet. The choice of the term depends on the prominence of the feature. It is also sometimes called the inframammary ligament. From the cosmetological point of view, it is an important aesthetic component of the breast which should be taken into consideration during various kinds of breast surgery.

Histologically, the inframammary fold is an intrinsic dermal structure consisting of regular arrays of collagen held in place by a specialized superficial fascia system. The fold is formed by the fusion of the superficial and mammary fasciae.
