= Breast augmentation =

Surgical procedure

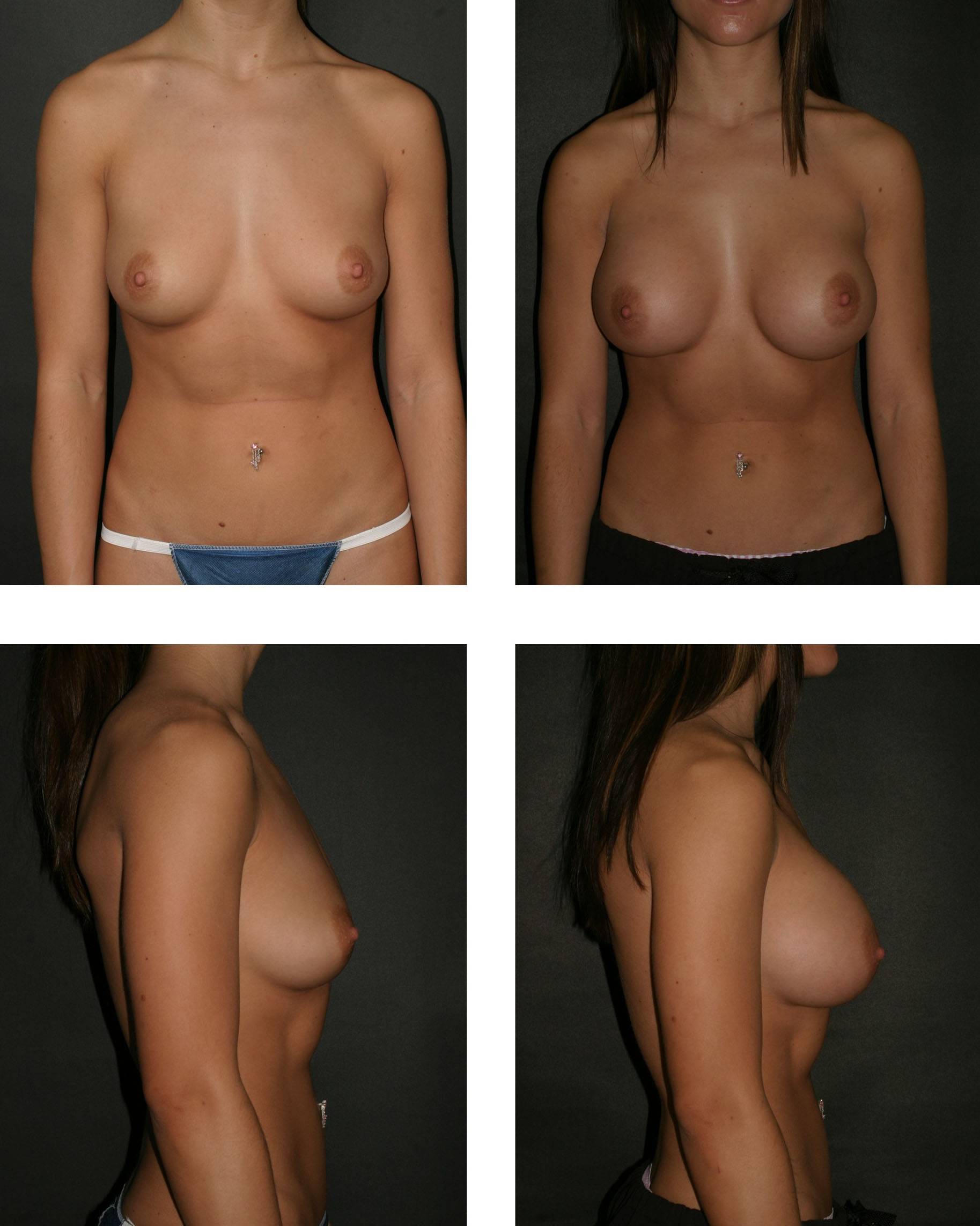
- The presurgical aspects (left) and the postsurgical aspects (right) of a bilateral, submuscular emplacement of 350 cc saline-solution implants through an inframammary fold (IMF) incision
- Specialty: Plastic surgeon

Breast augmentation (also breast enlargement) is a plastic surgery procedure by which either a breast implant or a fat-graft implant is emplaced to the thorax to increase the size of the breasts in order to correct congenital defects of the breast and of the chest wall. Consequently, after the breast-enlargement surgery, the symmetrical breast hemisphere is of proportionate size, has a smooth contour, and is anatomically consistent with the woman's body.

Three therapeutic purposes require the emplacement of a prosthetic breast: (i) primary reconstruction surgery of the chest and breast tissues damaged by breast cancer, blunt trauma, penetrating trauma, and blast injury; and of developmental defects of the thoracic anatomy, e.g. the tuberous breast deformity; (ii) the surgical revision and reconstruction of chest-and-breast-tissue complications arisen from a previous mammoplasty; and (iii) primary augmentation to surgically enhance the aesthetics of the bust and the breasts.

To augment the volume of the breast hemisphere, a prosthetic breast (saline or silicone) establishes the initial spherical augmentation of the breast for contouring by the plastic surgeon. To augment the volume of the breast hemisphere with autologous adipocyte tissue, the surgeon injects the woman's refined body-fat into the skin envelope to correct contour defects of the breast hemisphere. A fat-graft breast augmentation yields a breast-size increase is of modest volume, usually one brassière cup-size, consequent to the body's usual resorbtion of most of the autologous fat-graft.

== Breast-augmentation prostheses ==
=== Background history ===
The four types of breast-implant prostheses available for surgical breast reconstruction, breast augmentation, and the aesthetic enhancement (size, shape, texture) of the breasts of a woman are:

1. Saline breast prosthesis filled with sterile saline solution.
2. Silicone breast prosthesis filled with viscous silicone gel.
3. Alternative-composition breast prosthesis filled with various fillers (soy oil, polypropylene string); now discontinued.
4. Structured breast prosthesis constructed of nested shells, made of elastomer silicone, with saline solution filling the space between the silicone shells; now discontinued.

==== Saline breast prosthesis ====
The first commercial model of a breast prosthesis filled with saline solution was made by Laboratoires Arion of France, which they publicly presented as a prosthetic medical device in 1964. The modern models of prosthetic breasts filled saline-solution are made with vulcanized shells composed of a silicone elastomer of great elasticity, like that of the skin and tissues of a woman's breast. In an augmentation mammoplasty to emplace a saline breast-prosthesis, the plastic surgeon employs a short incision to the chest wall, through that incision the surgeon then inserts the collapsed, empty prosthetic breast into the breast-implant socket, then fills the implanted breast prosthesis with saline solution. The surgeon then contours the implanted prosthetic breast for anatomical symmetry, and afterwards sutures shut the insertion incision.

Functionally, the implantation of a saline breast-prosthesis yields good-to-excellent results of increased breast-size, a smoother contour for the breast hemisphere, and anatomic symmetry; however, such a breast augmentation might ripple and wrinkle the skin envelope of the breast, cosmetic defects that make noticeable the presence of the prosthetic breast to the eye and to the touch. Such cosmetic defects of the breast surgery usually occur among women with a small volume of adipose tissue in their breast hemispheres. In a woman with much breast tissue, for whom submuscular emplacement is the recommended surgical therapy, the aesthetic results of a saline breast-prosthesis are a proportionate breast-size, a smooth contour to the breast hemisphere, and anatomic symmetry, like the therapeutic results achieved with a prosthetic breast filled with silicone-gel.

==== Silicone-gel breast prosthesis ====
The first commercial model of a prosthetic breast filled with a type of silicone gel was invented in 1961, by the American plastic surgeons Frank Gerow and Thomas Cronin, manufactured by the Dow Corning Corporation, and in 1962 was the first silicone-gel prosthetic breast used for augmentation mammoplasty. The medical-device technology of the silicone-gel prosthetic breast is in five model generations.

First generation

The Cronin–Gerow prosthetic breast, Model 1963, was in the shape of a teardrop, made as a silicone rubber envelope-sack filled with a viscous silicone-gel. In surgical practise, to reduce the possible rotation of the prosthetic breast already emplaced in the implant socket in the chest, the Model 1963 breast prosthesis was held in place in the implant-socket with a fastener-patch of Dacron material (polyethylene terephthalate) that was attached to the back of the breast-prosthesis shell.

Second generation

In the 1970s, the first technology was a model of prosthetic-breast with a shell of thin-gauge material and a filler-gel of low-cohesion silicone, which materials improved anatomic function and symmetry (size, appearance, texture) after contouring by the surgeon. In practise, second-generation breast prostheses proved fragile, with greater rates of shell-rupture and filler-leakage. The increased rates-of-incidence of capsular contracture consequently resulted in faulty-product class action-lawsuits by the U.S. government against the manufacturers of thin-gauge-shell breast prostheses.

The second technology was a prosthetic breast with a polyurethane foam coating that reduced the rate of incidence of capsular contracture by causing an inflammatory reaction within the implant-socket in order to impede the formation of a capsule of fibrous collagen tissue around the prosthetic breast. In the event, the use of prosthetic breasts coated with polyurethane was discontinued in the U.S. because of the health risk posed by the carcinogenic chemical 2,4-toluene diamine (TDA), a by-product of the chemical breakdown of the polyurethane coating the prosthetic breast. Ultimately, prosthetic breasts coated with polyurethane remain in use in Europe and in South America.

The third technology for breast surgery was the double-lumen prosthetic breast, which featured a lumen (a breast prosthesis filled with silicone-gel) contained within a larger lumen (a breast prosthesis filled with saline-solution). The two-fold purpose of the double-lumen technology was: (i) the aesthetic benefits of silicone gel (contained in the inner lumen) that is enclosed within the outer lumen, which is filled with saline solution; and (ii) a breast prosthesis whose volume is post-operatively adjustable. In surgical practise, the double-lumen prosthetic breast is used primarily in reconstructive surgery of the breasts.

Third and fourth generations

In the 1980s, the third and fourth generations of breast prostheses featured shells coated with an elastomer that decreased gel bleed (filler leakage) into the thorax of the woman, which was achieved with thick filler-gels of various viscosities for the different models of prosthetic breast. The designs of the models of breast prostheses are anatomically symmetrical, in accordance with the body type of the woman. The shaped models realistically reproduce the types of breast hemispheres for the corresponding body-types of women. The tapered models of breast prosthesis feature a uniformly textured surface that produces friction to limit the rotation of the breast prosthesis within the implant-socket. Moreover, the round models of breast prosthesis are available in textured-surface models and in smooth-surface models, for when the prosthetic breast is not expected to rotate within the implant-socket.

Fifth generation

In the 1990s, the fifth generation of silicone-gel breast prosthesis contained a semi-solid silicone-gel with a viscosity that reduced the occurrence of filler leakage and the occurrence of the filler migration throughout the woman's body of any silicone-filler that leaked from the implant-pocket. The plastic surgery studies Experience with Anatomical, Soft Cohesive Silicone-gel Prosthesis in Cosmetic and Reconstructive Breast Implant Surgery (2004) and Cohesive Silicone-gel Breast Implants in Aesthetic and Reconstructive Breast Surgery (2005) reported lower incidence-rates of capsular contracture and lower incidence-rates of shell rupture, and rates of medical safety and technical efficacy greater than the rates of safety and efficacy of early-generation prosthetic breasts.

==== Alternative-composition breast prosthesis ====
The third category of prosthetic breast includes alternative-composition breast prostheses that featured fillers such as soy oil, polypropylene string, ox cartilage, Terylene wool, ground rubber, silastic rubber, and Teflon-silicone, which are substances harmful to the woman's body.

==== Structured breast prosthesis ====
The fourth category of prosthetic-breast technology is the structured breast-prosthesis, which was approved for breast surgery by the Food and Drug Administration in the U.S. and by Health Canada in Canada in 2014. As a medical device, the structured prosthetic-breast incorporates the technologies of saline-solution and of silicone-gel to achieve anatomical function and aesthetic symmetry. Technologically, the internal structure of the breast prosthesis is composed of three, nested shells (made of silicone rubber) that support the upper half of the breast hemisphere; the two spaces between the three nested shells is filled with saline solution. To implant a structured breast prosthesis, the plastic surgeon emplaces the folded, empty prosthetic breast into the implant-socket, then fills the prosthetic breast with saline solution, and afterwards sutures shut the insertion incision.

=== Breastfeeding and the prosthetic breast ===
The breasts of a woman are apocrine glands that produce breastmilk with which to feed an infant child. A woman with implanted prosthetic breasts can breastfeed an infant, yet the breast implants can interfere with the breastfeeding function, especially in the case of a woman whose breast augmentation surgery accidentally cut into the nipple-areola complex (NAC) and might either have damaged the lactiferous ducts or damaged the nerves that serve the nipple-areola complex.

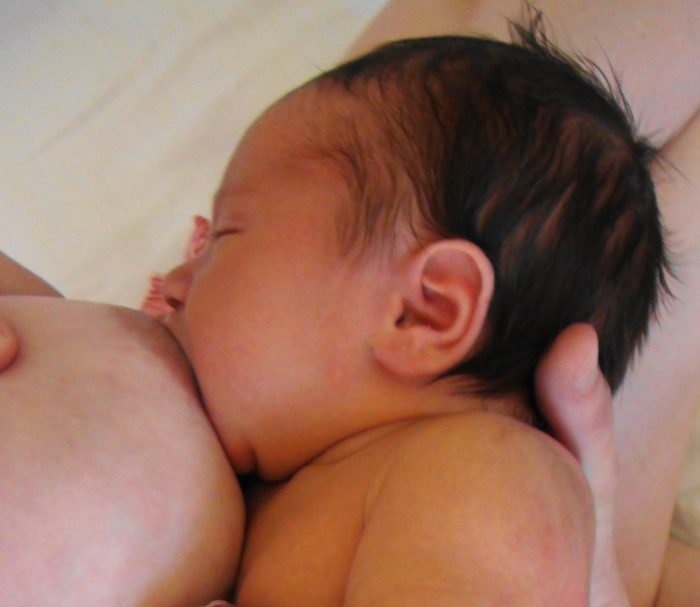
The breast in action: a slumbering, satisfied infant child.

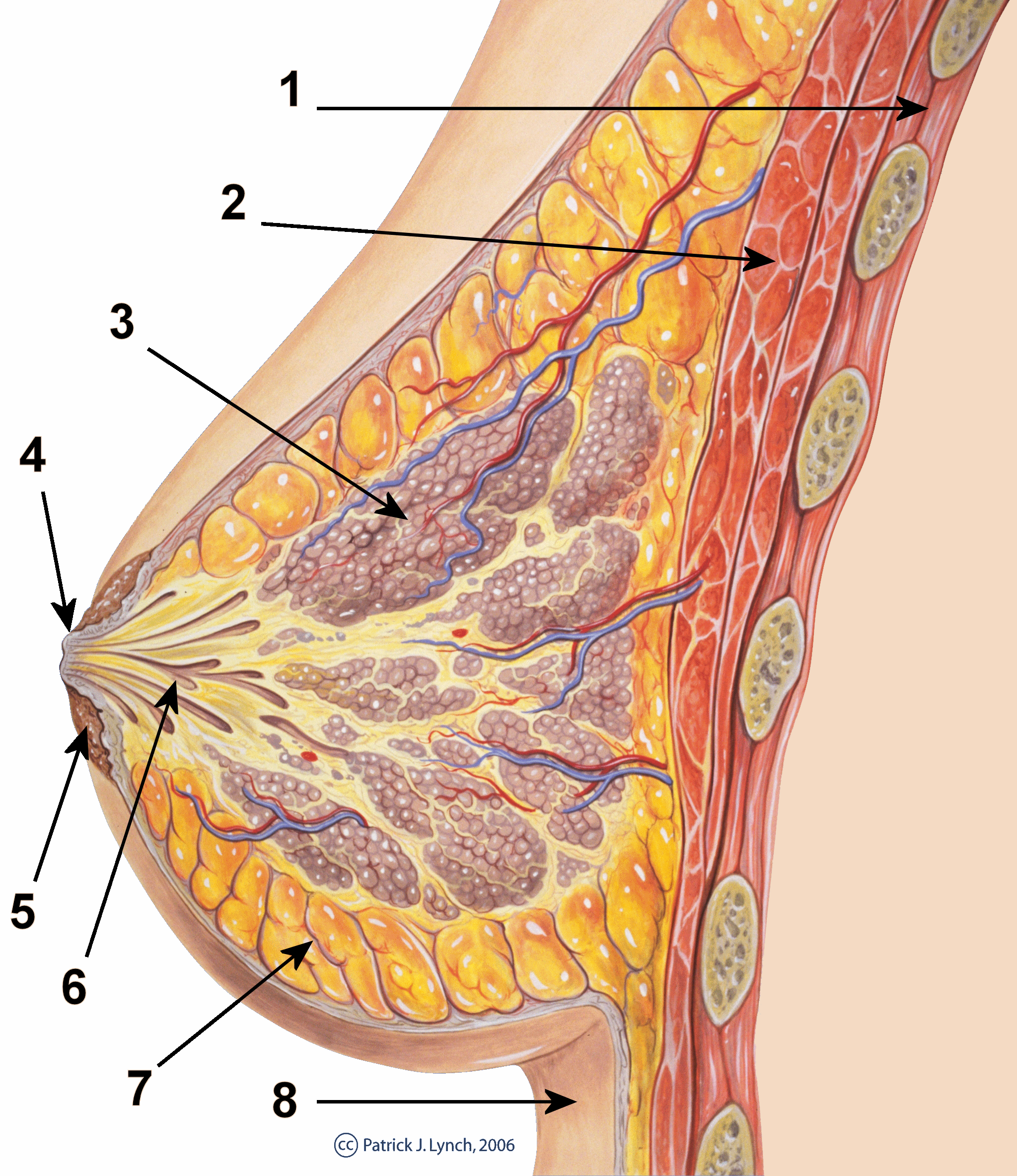
Cross-section of the breast anatomy of a woman.: 1. Chest wall; 2. Pectoralis muscles; 3. Lobules; 4. Nipple; 5. Areola; 6. Milk duct; 7. Fatty tissue; 8. Skin envelope

The breast augmentation procedures realised by way of IMF augmentation (through the inframammary fold), of the TABA augmentation via the armpit (trans-axillary breast augmentation), and of the TUBA augmentation via the navel (trans-umbilical breast augmentation) avoid the nipple-areola complex in order to preserve the tactile sensitivity of the areola and the breastfeeding functions. Moreover, two conditions most affect and interfere with the functioning of the lactiferous ducts: (i) the subglandular implantation of the prosthetic breast, and (ii) the implantation of oversized prosthetic-breasts. Therefore, the implantation of small prosthetic breasts and a submuscular implant-pocket are the breast-augmentation surgeries that least thwart the breastfeeding function.

==== Breast-filler toxicity ====
Biological risks to the health of a sucking infant arise from the possibility of breast-filler toxicity, that the filler-material (saline solution or silicone gel) might leak from the breast-implant into the body of the mother, then into her breast milk, and then into the infant organism; yet the biological risk to the breastfeeding infant is minimal, because silicone is indigestible and saline-solution is digestible. The study Silicone Breast Implants and Breastfeeding (1996) indicated that possible medical complications that impede breastfeeding can arise among women with silicone-filled prosthetic breasts, and found no causal relation between the presence of breast prostheses and neurological and physical impairment of the breastfeeding function of the augmented breasts.

==== Platinum toxicity ====
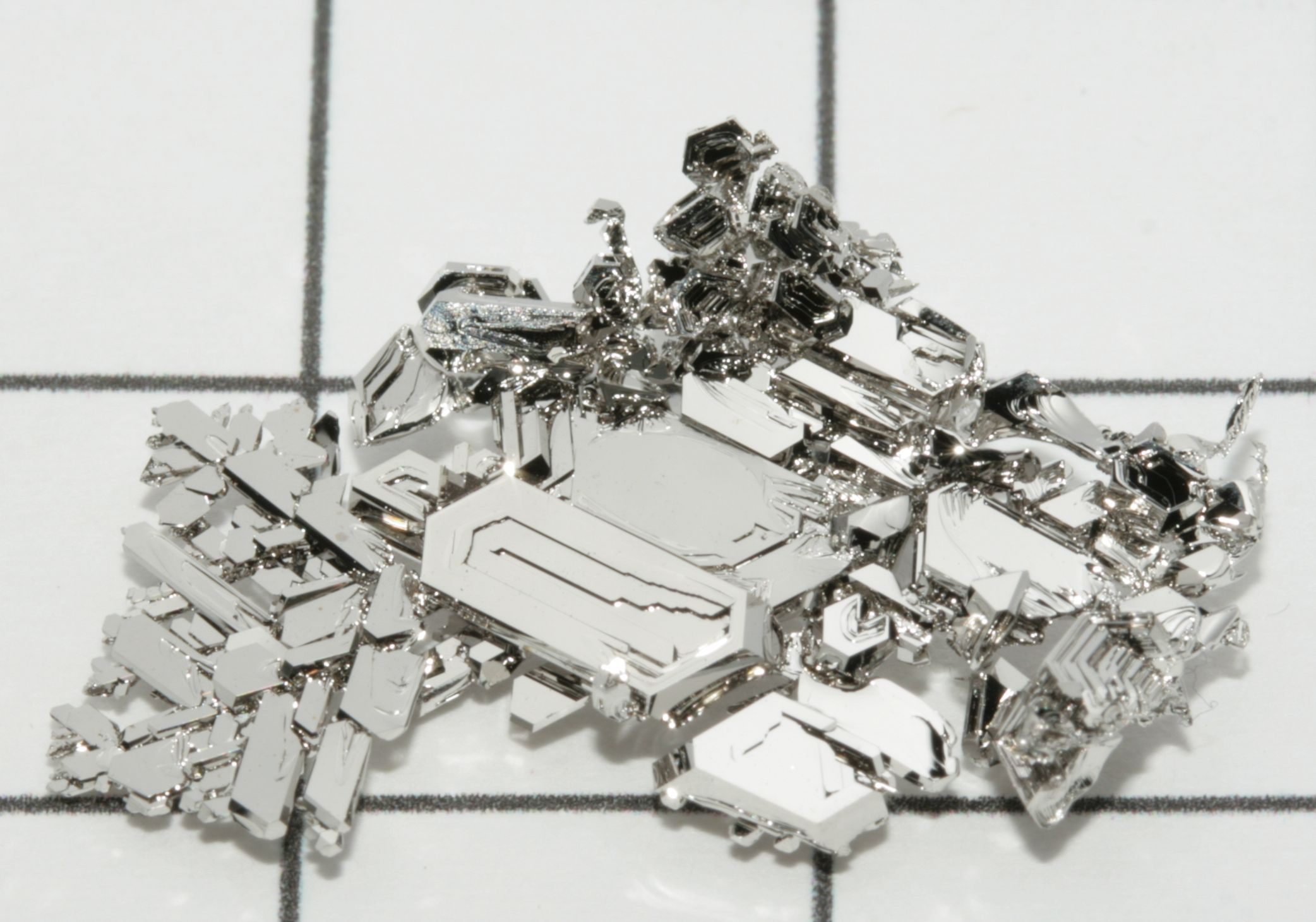
Platinum toxicity: platinum metal is a catalyst used to make silicone breast implants, and a suspected cause of tissue ionization in women with silicone-gel prosthetic breasts.

The industrial manufacture of silicone breast prostheses employs the metallic element platinum (Pt, 78) as a catalyst for chemically transforming liquid silicone oil into viscous silicone gel, the elastomer material for making breast-implant shells. Occasionally, trace quantities of platinum leak from a prosthetic breast into the woman's body and accumulate in the bone marrow, from where red blood cells would deposit the trace-platinum upon nerve endings and consequently cause disorders of the nervous system, such as blindness, deafness, and nervous tics (involuntary muscle contractions).

The FDA's review of the trace-platinum-toxicity data about the silicone-gel used for making prosthetic breasts said that the type of platinum used in modern silicone breast implants is not ionized platinum, and so not a biological risk to women with such prosthetic breasts. That there were no reports of trace-platinum-toxicity and no causal relation between the metal in the silicone-gel and the occurrence of trace-platinum-toxicity among women with silicone-gel prosthetic breasts.

== Breast surgery procedures ==
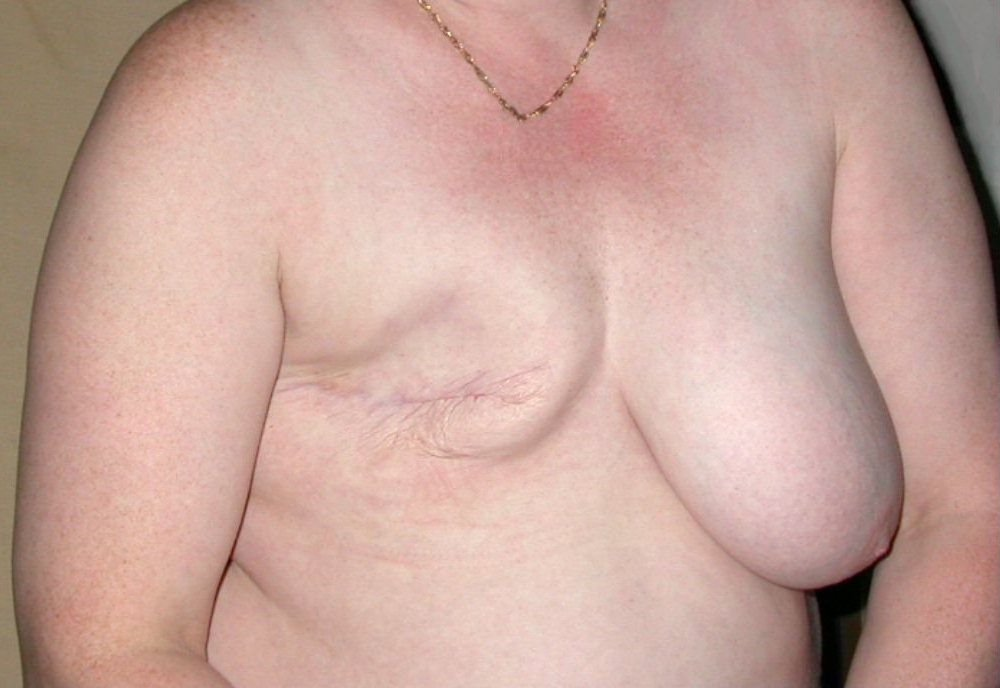
Breast reconstruction: the postoperative aspect of a right-breast cancer mastectomy for which the woman requires a primary breast-reconstruction with a prosthetic breast.

A breast-augmentation surgery for the implantation of a prosthetic breast has three therapeutic purposes:

1. Primary reconstruction: to correct the breast hemisphere by repairing chest-and-breast tissues damaged by breast cancer, by blunt trauma and penetrating trauma, by a blast injury, and the failed anatomic development of the chest, such as a tuberous breast deformity.
2. Revision and reconstruction: to correct the unsuccessful outcome of a previous mammoplasty procedure.
3. Primary augmentation: to enhance the aesthetic qualities of the breasts (cup-size, form, and texture).

The type of breast reconstruction approach is determined by the severity of the mastectomy. The type of breast-augmentation surgery is determined by the procedure for emplacing the prosthetic breasts, the type of surgical incision, the type and model of the prosthetic breast, and the location of the implant-pocket in the chest of the woman.

=== Types of surgical incision ===
To realise the emplacement of a prosthetic breast (saline-solution or silicone-gel) into the implant-pocket of the woman patient, plastic surgeons employ five types of surgical incision:

Inframammary fold
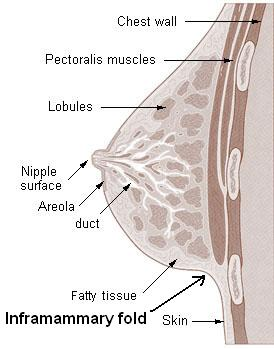
- Cross-section of the breast of a woman.

1. Inframammary incision: The plastic surgeon makes a long cut at the inframammary fold (IMF) — the bottom border of the breast — for maximal access to the interior of the breast hemisphere. The inframammary incision allows for the precise cutting of tissues in order to securely emplace the prosthetic breast into the implant-pocket cut into the chest muscle. Moreover, according to the skin-type of the woman, the emplacement of a prosthetic breast by way of an IMF-incision can result in noticeable surgical scars.
2. Periareolar incision: The surgeon makes a short incision (5.0 cm.) along the areolar periphery (outside border of the areola) which allows for the symmetrical adjustment of the position of the inframammary fold (IMF) of the augmented breast. The periareolar incision is made at the medial-half (bottom half) of the outside border of the nipple-areola complex (NAC) of the breast to be augmented. Given the narrow access allowed into the skin-envelope of the breast hemisphere, the short, five-centimetre length of the periareolar incision makes difficult the surgeon's emplacement of a voluminous breast-implant made of silicone gel. Moreover, as a surgical approach, the periareolar incision (cutting along the outside border of the NAC) allows the plastic surgeon to also do a breast-lift procedure that has been included to an initial, primary mammoplasty procedure. In the therapeutic long term, the emplacement of a prosthetic breast through a periareolar incision tends to a greater rate of incidence of capsular contracture, and also risks severing the breastmilk ducts and the nerves of the NAC, which would impede breastfeeding.
3. Transaxillary incision: The plastic surgeon makes an incision at the axilla area (armpit) that allows tunnelling medially (cutting across) under the skin of the thorax — from the armpit to the bust area of the chest — in order to emplace the breast prosthesis into the implant-pocket of the breast to be augmented. The surgeon emplaces the prosthetic breast by cutting the cross-wise tunnel either bluntly (by hand) or mechanically (with an endoscope). The surgical approach of the transaxillary incision avoids cutting and scarring the skin envelope of the breast. The technical challenge is determining the ideal position of the prosthetic-breast within the implant-pocket in order to achieve a symmetrical breast hemisphere.
4. Transumbilical incision: To realise an endoscopic TUBA procedure (trans-umbilical breast augmentation), the surgeon makes an incision at the navel to allow tunneling superiorly (cutting upwards) under the abdominal skin — from the waist to the chest — in order to emplace the saline prosthetic breast into the implant-pocket of the breast to be augmented. The endoscopic surgical approach of the TUBA incision avoids cutting and scarring the skin envelope of the breast.
5. Transabdominal incision: To realise an endoscopic TABA procedure (transabdominal breast augmentation), the plastic surgeon makes an incision at the navel that will allow tunneling superiorly (cutting upwards) under the abdominal skin — from the waist to the chest — in order to emplace the prosthetic breast into the bluntly-cut implant-pocket of the breast to be augmented, whilst the patient simultaneously undergoes an abdominoplasty procedure.

=== Implant-pocket placement ===
The four surgical approaches for the emplacement of a prosthetic breast into the implant-pocket are described in anatomical relation to the pectoralis major muscle, the major muscle of the chest.

1. Subglandular implant-pocket: The plastic surgeon emplaces the breast implant to the retromammary space — between the breast tissue and the pectoralis major muscle — which is the orientation that most approximates the normal plane of the breast. Although this surgical approach to emplacing a prosthetic breast yields the most aesthetic results, in women with a small volume of soft-tissue in the breast, the subglandular emplacement of the implant is likelier to ripple and wrinkle the skin-envelope of the breast.
2. Subfascial implant-pocket: The surgeon emplaces the prosthetic breast beneath the fascia (the membrane that covers and encloses the pectoralis major muscle) to augment the size and volume of the breast hemisphere, for subsequent contouring and anatomic symmetry.
3. Subpectoral implant-pocket: In this dual-plane surgical approach, the surgeon emplaces the breast implant beneath the pectoralis major muscle (after partially cutting the inferior attachments of that muscle) with or without the partial cutting of the subglandular plane of the breast. Resultantly, the upper-half of the breast-implant is partially beneath the pectoralis major muscle, while the lower-half of the implant is in the subglandular plane of the breast being augmented. This emplacement technique achieves maximal coverage of the upper-half of the breast implant, whilst allowing the maximal expansion of the lower-half of the implant to achieve maximal breast-volume; however, there exists the risk of animation deformity, the breast-implant moving in place beneath the subpectoral plane.
4. Submuscular pocket: The plastic surgeon emplaces the prosthetic breast beneath the pectoralis major muscle without cutting the inferior origin of that muscle. The total coverage of the prosthetic breast can be achieved by releasing the lateral muscles of the chest wall (either the serratus muscle or the pectoralis minor muscle) and then attach those lateral muscles to the pectoralis major muscle to augment the breast.

In selected patients with mild (Grade I) breast ptosis, breast augmentation alone may improve breast contour without a concurrent mastopexy. A 2026 retrospective series of 198 patients undergoing dual-plane II augmentation reported two revisions for superior implant malposition (1.0%) and one delayed mastopexy (0.5%). The authors emphasized that patient selection involved breast measurements, tissue characteristics, estimated glandular volume, and patient expectations rather than a single anatomical measurement.

=== Post-surgical recovery ===
The surgical scars of a breast augmentation mammoplasty heal at 6-weeks post-operative, and fade within several months, according to the skin type of the woman. Depending upon the daily physical activity the woman might require, the augmentation mammoplasty patient usually resumes her normal life activities at about 1-week post-operative. The woman who underwent submuscular implantation (beneath the pectoralis major muscles) usually has a longer post–operative convalescence, and experiences more pain, because of the healing of the deep-tissue cuts into the chest muscles for the breast augmentation. The patient usually does not exercise or engage in strenuous physical activities for about six weeks. Moreover, during the initial convalescence, the patient is encouraged to regularly exercise (flex and move) her arms to alleviate pain and discomfort; and, as required, analgesic medication catheters for alleviating pain.

=== Medical complications ===
The emplacement of a prosthetic breast presents the risks of medical complication usual to undergoing surgery, such as: an adverse reaction to anesthesia, a breast hematoma (post-operative bleeding), a seroma (fluid accumulation), and infection of the surgical wound. The medical complications of breast augmentation include: pain in the breast, altered tactile sensation, wrinkling and asymmetry of the breast hemisphere, thinning of the breast skin, impeded breastfeeding functions, and symmastia, the bread-loafing of the bust, which condition elevates the natural plane (cleavage) between the breast hemispheres.

The functional complications of the prosthetic breast — capsular contracture and capsular rupture — are managed with periodic, preventative physical examinations and MRI examinations. Medical complications from the emplacement surgery and complications (scarring) from the application of tissue expanders (place-holder prosthetics) occur in approximately six to seven per cent (6–7%) of breast-augmentation patients. Statistically, twenty per cent (20%) of women with prosthetic breasts for aesthetic enhancement, and fifty per cent (50%) of women with prosthetic breasts for breast reconstruction, required the explantation of their failed breast-prostheses at the ten-year mark. In 2019, upon identification of a causal relation between Allergan Biocell breast prostheses (with a textured surface) and an immune-system cancer [anaplastic, large-cell lymphoma (BIA-ALCL)], the FDA recalled every model of prosthetic breast made by the Allergan Biocell company.

=== Rupture of the prosthetic breast ===
Because the prosthetic breast is an inorganic foreign object in the body of the woman, her immune system defensively responds by encapsulating the breast prosthesis (saline solution or silicone gel) in a hard-shell capsule of fibrous collagen. In time, the body's continual thickening of the fibrous capsule exerts mechanical compression forces upon the prosthetic breast that cause two ruptures that will leak filler-material: (i) the intracapsular rupture of the prosthesis, wherein the leaked filler-material remains within the fibrous capsule that contains the ruptured prosthetic breast, and (ii) the extracapsular rupture of the prosthesis, wherein the filler-material leaks out of the ruptured fibrous capsule and into the implant-pocket, from where that leaked filler-material will migrate into the thorax of the woman.

As a medical-device failure, the rupture of a breast implant usually is not immediately noticed by or is evident to the woman, because the prosthetic filler-material — saline solution or silicone gel — is biologically inert and is not absorbed by her body, and thus causes her no immediate sickness. The migration of the filler-material that has leaked from the breast-implant into the woman's thorax usually provokes medical complications in the pectoral area (the bust) area and in the axillary area (the armpit), and occur are as granulomas (inflamed nodules) and as lymphadenopathy (enlarged lymph nodes in the armpit).

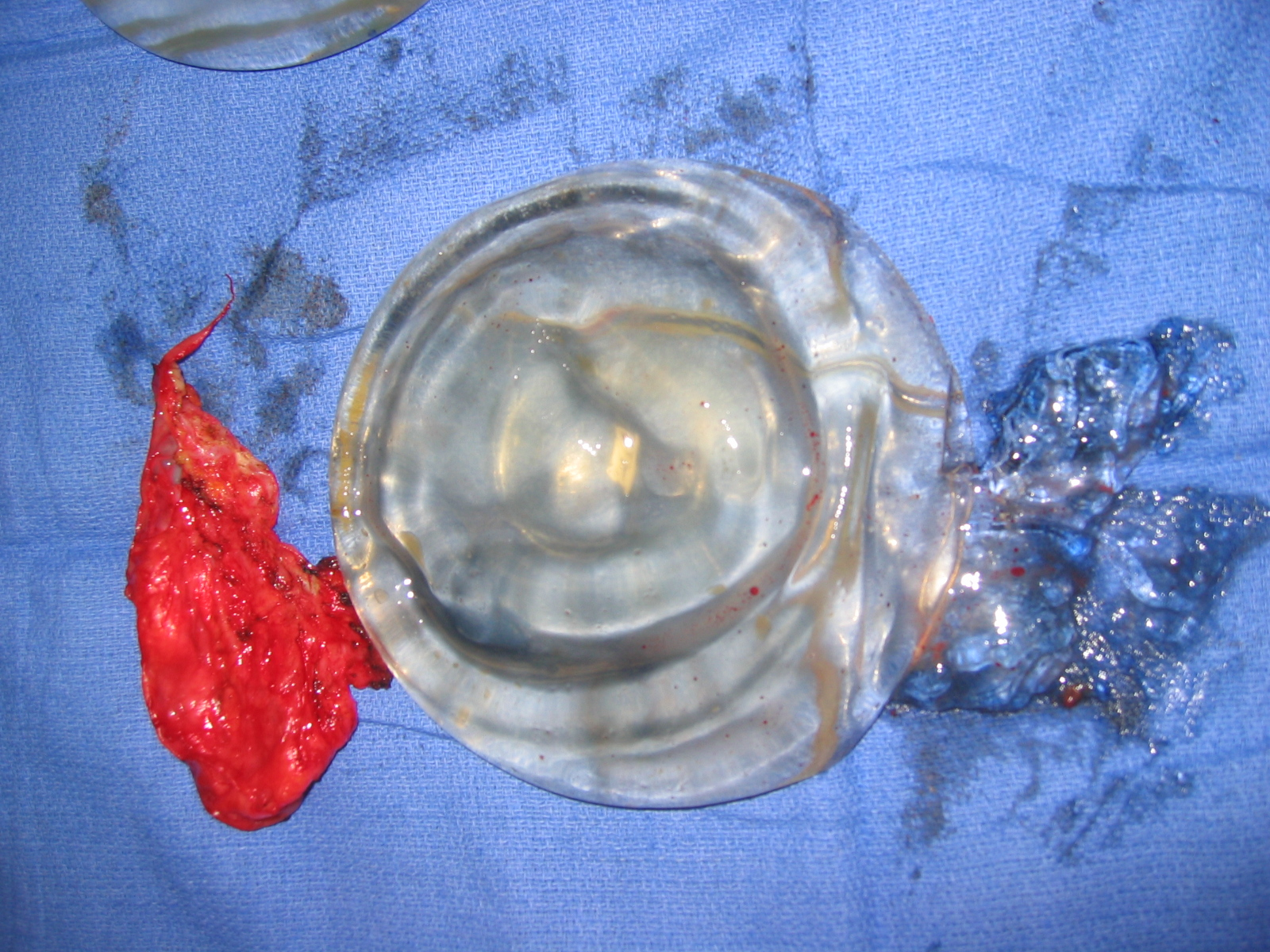
Medical-device failure: The capsular contraction that ruptured a prosthetic breast is resolved by the surgical explantation of the red fibrous-capsule (left), the ruptured envelope (center), and the transparent silicone-gel filler material (right) that leaked into the thorax of the woman.

The mechanisms of breast-implant rupture are

- Damage during the emplacement surgery
- Damage during a thoracic surgery
- Chemical degradation of the silicone shell of the prosthesis
- Trauma: blunt trauma, penetrating trauma, blast trauma
- Mechanical pressure, e.g. capsular contracture and mammogram breast examination

As a Class III medical device, the breast implant is an industrial product that eventually fails because of age and design flaws of material and manufacture; thus the rupture-and-deflation of a prosthetic breast is a medical-device failure resolved with the surgical explantation and replacement of the failed prosthetic breast with a new model of prosthetic breast. In that light, the Food and Drug Administration informed the women of the U.S. that breast implants are medical devices of finite shelf-life that wear out and fail. That the longer a woman has breast implants in her body — either saline solution or silicone gel — the greater the statistical likelihood of her experiencing the medical complications of the rupture-and-deflation failure of her prosthetic breasts.

For Second-generation prosthetic breasts (silicone shell, single-lumen) designed in the 1970s, the rupture-deflation defect occurred at the rate of eight to fifteen per cent (8–15%) at the ten-year mark after the surgery; which occurred among fifteen to thirty per cent (15–30%) of the cohort of mammoplasty patients. The study Safety and Effectiveness of Mentor's MemoryGel Implants at 6 Years (2009) reported a medical-device rate of failure of one-point-one per cent (1.1%) at the six-year mark after the surgery. Moreover, the data for failed breast prostheses indicated a rupture-and-deflation rate of one-point-zero per cent (1.0%) at the six-year, median age of the medical device.

Regarding the detection of rupture-and-deflation defects, The Diagnosis of Silicone Breast-implant Rupture: Clinical Findings Compared with Findings at Magnetic Resonance Imaging (2005) indicated that, in women without the symptoms of a medical-device failure, the physician's manual examination identified and confirmed only thirty per cent (30%) of breast-implant ruptures, whereas MRI examinations detected eighty-six per cent (86%) of breast-implant ruptures. Consequently, the FDA recommended that women schedule an MRI examination of their prosthetic breasts to detect rupture-and-leakage defects, at the three-year mark after the surgery; and afterwards schedule a defect-detection MRI examination every two years: (i) for the woman with a suspected breast-implant rupture; and (ii) for the confirmation of mammographic and ultrasonic studies that indicate the presence of a ruptured breast implant.

Regarding the detection-and-confirmation of a failed breast-implant, the study Natrelle Saline-filled Breast Implants: a Prospective 10-year Study (2009) reported a rupture-and-deflation rate of three to five per cent (3–5%) at the three-year mark, and a rupture-and-deflation rate of seven to ten per cent (7–10%) at the ten-year mark after the surgery for breast augmentation. The study Does Overfilling Smooth Inflatable Saline-filled Breast Implants Decrease the Deflation Rate? Experience with 4,761 Augmentation Mammaplasty Patients reported that overfilling the prosthetic breast with saline solution (by approx. 10–13%) reduced the rate of rupture-and-deflation to one-point-eighty-three per cent (1.83%) at the eight-year mark after the surgery.

=== Capsular contracture ===
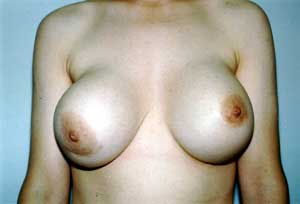
Medical-device failure: a Baker-scale Grade IV capsular contraction of the capsular fibrosis enclosing a silicone-gel prosthetic breast that was implanted below the right mammary gland of the woman.

The human body's immune response to a surgically-implanted foreign object (prosthetic breast, cardiac pacemaker, orthopedic prosthesis) is to biologically isolate the foreign object with a capsule of tightly-woven collagen fibres. Afterwards, the capsular contracture occurs over time when the thickened, collagen-fibre capsule has compressed inwards, against the breast-implant with great mechanical pressure that deforms and breaks the implant, and so disfigures the breast; the causes of capsular contracture include bacterial contamination, shell-rupture of the medical device, leakage of the prosthetic filler-material, and hematoma.

A 2026 single-surgeon retrospective study of 209 patients undergoing surgical correction of high-riding saline breast implants reported macroscopically normal capsules in all cases at surgery. The authors proposed that some deformities resembling Baker Grade III capsular contracture may instead reflect mechanical implant malposition, although prospective validation is needed. The prosthetic-breast implantation surgeries that have a low-rate of capsular contractures include surgical approaches that feature the submuscular emplacement of the breast-implant and the use of breast implants with a textured surface; limited handling of the breast implants before the surgery, limited contact with and handling of the skin of the implant-pocket, and irrigation of the surgical site with antibiotic solutions.

To correct a capsular contraction, the plastic surgeon realises an open capsulotomy procedure to loosen and release the collagen-fibre capsule from the implant-pocket, for removal and replacement with a new model of prosthetic breast. Moreover, non-surgical therapies for treating collagen-fibre capsules include massage, external ultrasonic therapy, pharmaceutic therapy with leukotriene pathway inhibitor medications, and Diapulse therapy (Pulsed Electromagnetic Field Therapy, PEMFT).

==== Revision surgery ====
After a breast-augmentation surgery, the patient faces the possibility of a medical complication arising from the physical and the physiological changes undergone by the cut tissues of the body (chest muscles, underlying soft tissues, skin-envelope of the breast hemisphere), thus the surgical wounds are greatly susceptible to external contamination, bacterial infection, and physical damage — especially in the cases of women who underwent a breast-enlargement surgery whilst also undergoing scheduled radiation therapy. A woman with breast cancer usually undergoes a revision surgery to re-establish the symmetry between the nipple-areola complex of each breast and so recreate the natural appearance of her bust (size, form, feel). The rate of revision surgeries was three-point-zero per cent (3.0%) at the seven-year mark, compared to the re-operation rate of twenty per cent (20%) at the three-year mark.

The therapeutic indications for a re-operation (revision surgery) of the augmented breast are: medical complications, capsular contracture, shell-rupture of the medical device, leakage of the silicone-gel filler material, and the rupture-and-deflation of the prosthetic breast.

==== Systemic sickness ====
Since the 1990s, reviews of studies for causal relations between silicone-gel prosthetic breasts and systemic disease reported no causal relation to the occurrences of either systemic or autoimmune diseases; nonetheless, many women reported suffering neurological and rheumatological illnesses caused by failures of their prosthetic breasts. The study Long-term Health Status of Danish Women with Silicone Breast Implants (2004), reported that in relation to women of the general population, women with prosthetic breasts did not have a greater rate of incidence and diagnosis of autoimmune disease; that their rate of incidence for musculoskeletal disease was lower than the rate of incidence among women who had undergone other types of cosmetic surgery.

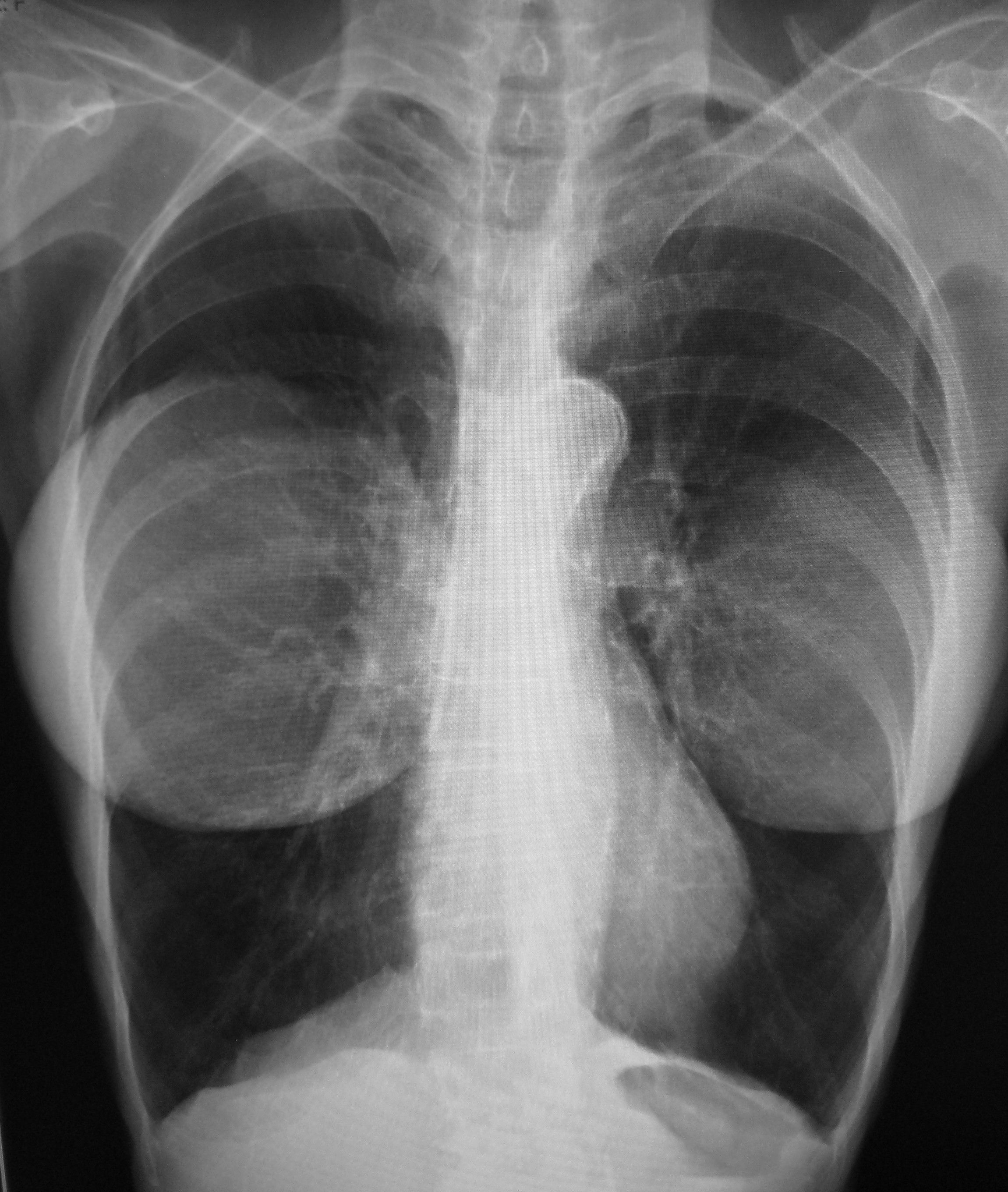
Prosthetic breasts: the chest X-ray image of a woman with bilateral breast prostheses shows that the implanted prostheses are radiographically opaque, and are foreign objects in her body.

Follow-up longitudinal studies of women with prosthetic breasts indicated no causal relation between the presence of a breast prosthesis and the occurrence of either a systemic disease or an autoimmune disease. European and North American studies reported that women who had undergone an augmentation mammoplasty tended to be healthier than the general population; that plastic surgery patients had a lower standardized mortality ratio than did other types of surgery patient; and that women with prosthetic breasts faced a greater rate of incidence for lung cancer than did other types of plastic-surgery patient.

Moreover, because only the study Long-term Cancer Risk among Swedish Women with Cosmetic Breast Implants: an Update of a Nationwide Study (2006) controlled for tobacco smoking, the data were insufficient to establish verifiable statistical differences between smokers and non-smokers and the greater incidence of death by lung cancer for women with prosthetic breasts. The long-term study of 25,000 women, Mortality among Canadian Women with Cosmetic Breast Implants (2006), reported that breast prostheses do not directly increase mortality in women.

The study Silicone-gel Breast Implant Rupture, Extracapsular Silicone, and Health Status in a Population of Women (2001) reported an increased rate of incidence of fibromyalgia among women who had suffered a capsular contracture that leaked silicone-gel, than among women whose prosthetic breasts had neither ruptured nor leaked. That study was criticized as methodologically flawed, and had presented no evidence of a causal relation between the presence of a prosthetic breast and the occurrence of systemic disease. Upon investigation, the FDA concluded that the epidemiological evidence in the medical literature does not support an association between fibromyalgia and breast implants. Likewise, the review study, Silicone Breast implants and Connective tissue Disease: No Association (2011) reported that the scientific literature does not support any claims about a causal relation between prosthetic breasts and connective-tissue disease.

== Fat-graft breast augmentation ==
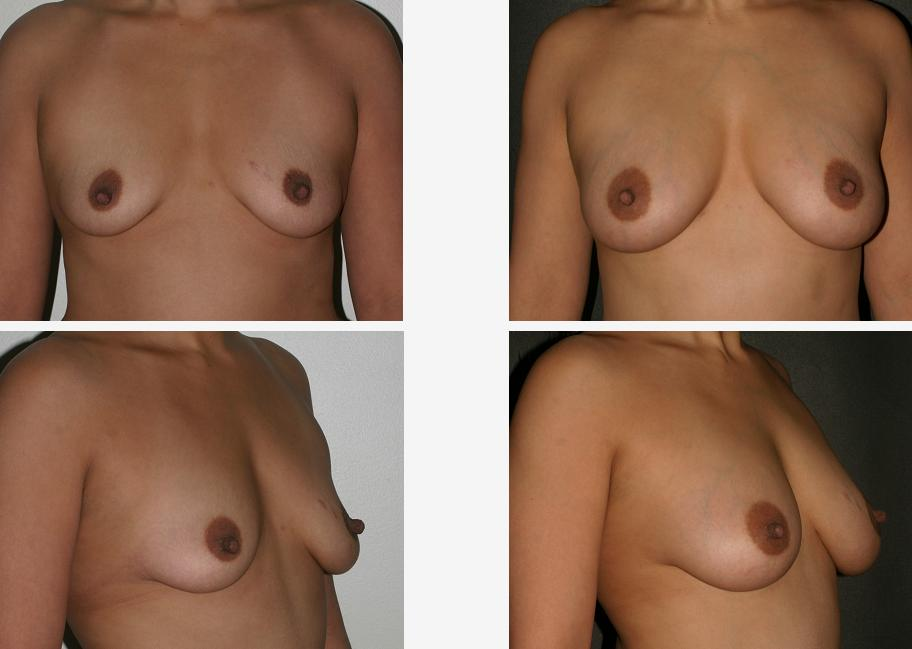
Fat-graft breast augmentation: the pre-procedural aspects (left) and the post-procedural aspects (right) of breasts enlarged and contoured with autologous fat grafts

Breast augmentation with fat-grafts (adipocyte tissue) harvested from the body of the patient (autologous fat) is indicated for women requiring breast reconstruction, the surgical correction of a congenital defect, and the æsthetic enhancement of the bust.

- post-mastectomy re-creation of the breast(s); trauma damage (blunt, penetrating), disease (breast cancer), and explantation deformity (empty breast-implant socket).
- congenital defect correction: micromastia, tuberous breast deformity, and Poland's syndrome.
- primary augmentation: the aesthetic enhancement (contouring) of the size, form, and feel of the breasts.

The application of the adipose fat tissue as autologous filler for injection to correct bodily defects and for breast augmentation was developed by Melvin Bircoll by way of the fat-injection method. In 1987, the surgeon Eduardo Krulig injected fat-grafts with a syringe and a blunt-tip needle, and also used a disposable fat trap to facilitate the collection of body fat and to ensure the sterility of the harvested adipocyte tissue.

The doctors J. Newman and J. Levin designed a lipo-injector gun with a gear-driven plunger for the even injection of autologous fat-tissue to the breast-implant pocket. The design of the lipo-injector gun featured a ratchet-gear for accurately emplacing the fat-grafts to the breast-implant pocket; the trigger action injected 0.1 cm^{3} of filler. Non-surgical, fat-graft augmentations of the breast employs adipocyte fat from elsewhere in the body of the woman (up to 300 ml of body fat) with three injections of equal volume, is injected to the subpectoral space and to the intrapectoral space of the pectoralis major muscle, and to the submammary space in order to achieve a breast of natural appearance and contour.

The study Radiological Evaluation of Breasts Reconstructed with Lipo-modeling (2005) indicates that the therapeutic efficacy of fat-graft breast reconstruction in the treatment of radiation therapy damage to the chest, the incidental reduction of capsular contracture, and the improved coverage of the breast implants. In fat-graft breast augmentation procedures, there is the risk that the adipocyte tissue can become necrotic, undergo metastatic calcification, develop cysts, and agglomerate into palpable lumps. Although the cause of metastatic calcification is unknown, the post-procedure biological changes occurred to the fat-graft tissue resemble the tissue changes usual to breast surgery procedures, such as reduction mammoplasty.

The pre-procedure mammograms were negative for the presence of the malignant neoplasms of breast cancer. In the 17-patient cohort, two women developed breast cancer after the breast augmentation: one woman at 12 months and the second woman at 92 months. Further, the study Cell-assisted Lipotransfer for Cosmetic Breast Augmentation: Supportive Use of Adipose-Derived Stem/Stromal Cells (2007), in a 40-woman cohort, the inclusion of adipose stem cells in the grafts of adipocyte fat increased the rate of the corrective success of the autologous fat-grafting procedure.

=== Fat grafting techniques ===
The centrifugal refinement of the harvested adipocyte tissues removes blood products and free lipids to produce autologous breast-filler. The injectable filler-fat is obtained by centrifuging the syringes with body-fat in order to separate the serum, blood, and liquid fat components by density, to produce refined, injection-quality body-fat. For facial injection quality, the fat-filled syringes are centrifuged for 1.0 minute at 2,000 RPM. Moreover, centrifugation at 10,000 RPM for 10 minutes produces a collagen graft, the histologic composition of which is cellular residues, collagen fibres, and 5.0 percent intact fat cells. Because the woman's body absorbs some of the fat grafts, the breasts retain their contours and volumes for 18–24 months.

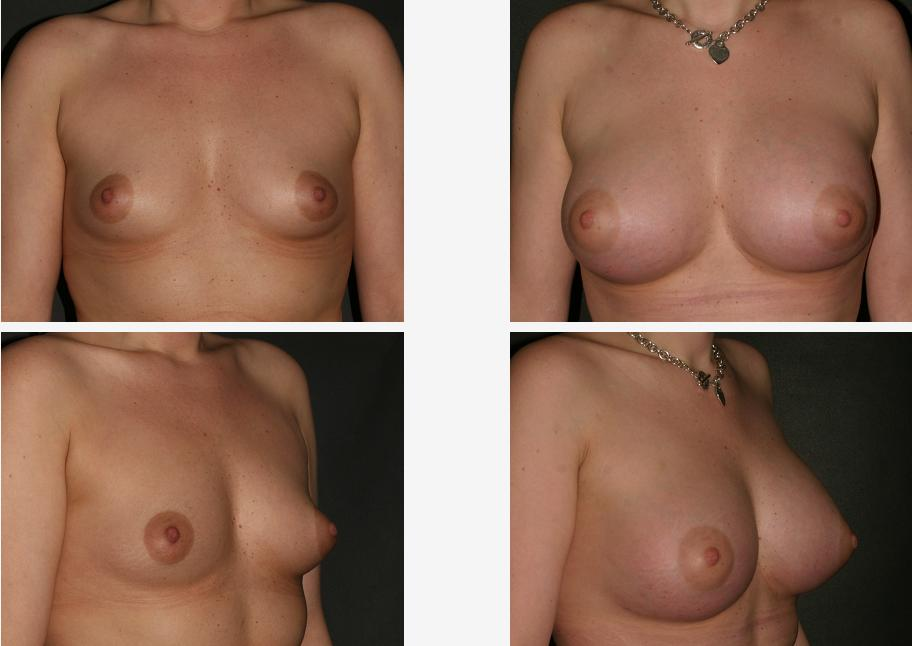
Fat-graft breast augmentation: the pre-operative aspects (left) and the post-operative aspects (right) of a large-volume non-surgical augmentation

The study Fat Grafting to the Breast Revisited: Safety and Efficacy (2007) indicates that the autologous fat was harvested by liposuction with a 10-ml. syringe attached to a two-hole Coleman harvesting cannula; after centrifugation, the refined breast filler-fat was transferred to 3-ml. syringes. Blunt infiltration cannulas were used to inject the body-fat through 2-mm. incisions; the blunt cannula injection method allowed greater dispersion of small aliquots (equal measures) of body-fat, and reduced the possibility of intravascular fat injection. The 2-mm. incisions were positioned to allow the injection of the fat-grafts from two injection sites; a 0.2 ml fat volume was injected with each withdrawal of the cannula.

The breast-contours were realized by layering the fat-grafts at different levels within the breast hemisphere. The fat-graft injection technique allows the plastic surgeon to accurately define the contour of the breast — from the chest wall to the breast-skin envelope— with subcutaneous fat-grafts to the superficial planes of the breast. The greater control in sculpting the contour of the breast is unlike the global augmentation realised with an implant below the breast or below the pectoralis major muscle, respectively expanding the retromammary space and the retropectoral space. The greatest proportion of the grafted fat usually is infiltrated to the pectoralis major muscle, then to the retropectoral space, and to the prepectoral space (before and behind the pectoralis major muscle). Moreover, fat-grafting to the breast parenchyma increases the degree of projection of the bust.

==== Fat-graft injection ====
The biologic survival of autologous fat tissue depends upon the correct handling of the fat graft, of its careful washing (refinement) to remove extraneous blood cells, and of the controlled, blunt-cannula injection (emplacement) of the refined fat-tissue grafts to an adequately vascularized recipient site. Because the body resorbs some of the injected fat grafts (volume loss), compensative over-filling aids in obtaining a satisfactory breast outcome for the patient; thus the transplantation of large-volume fat grafts greater than required, because only 25–50 percent of the fat graft survives at 1-year post-transplantation.

The correct technique maximizes fat graft survival by minimizing cellular trauma during the liposuction harvesting and the centrifugal refinement, and by injecting the fat in small aliquots (equal measures), not clumps (too-large measures). Injecting minimal-volume aliquots with each pass of the cannula maximizes the surface area contact, between the grafted fat-tissue and the recipient breast-tissue, because proximity to a vascular system (blood supply) encourages histologic survival and minimizes the potential for fat necrosis. Transplanted autologous fat tissue undergoes histologic changes like those undergone by a bone transplant; if the body accepts the fat-tissue graft, it is replaced with new fat tissue, if the fat-graft dies it is replaced by fibrous tissue. New fat tissue is generated by the activity of a large, wandering histocyte-type cell, which ingests fat and then becomes a fat cell. When the breast-filler fat is injected to the breasts in clumps (too-large measures), fat cells emplaced too distant from blood vessels might die, which can lead to fat tissue necrosis, causing lumps, calcifications, and the eventual formation of liponecrotic cysts.

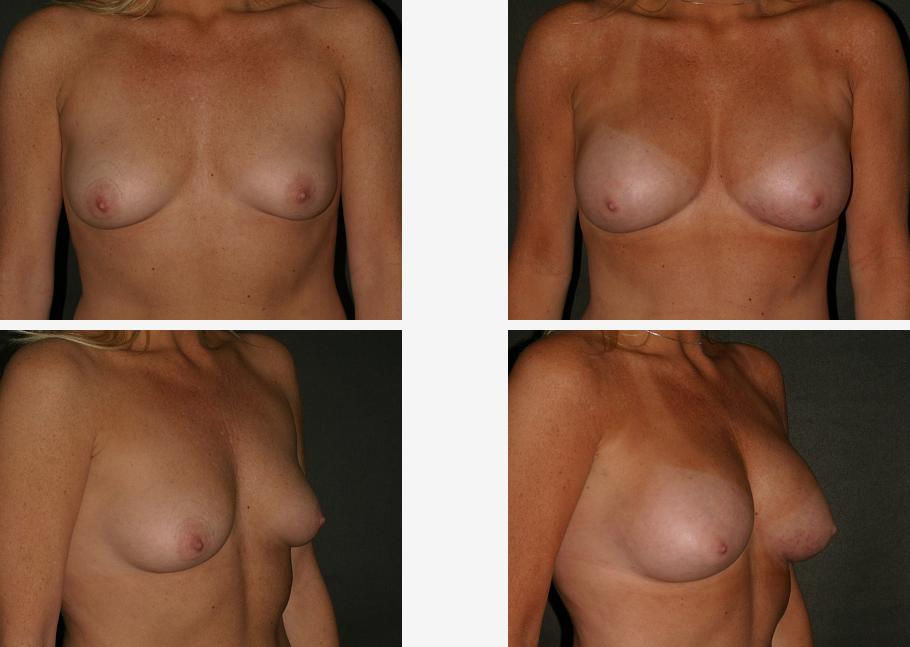
Fat-graft breast augmentation: the pre-operative aspects (left) and the post-operative aspects (right) of a medium-volume non-surgical augmentation

The operating room time required to harvest, refine, and emplace fat to the breasts is greater than the usual 2-hour OR time; the usual infiltration time was approximately 2 hours for the first 100 cm^{3} volume, and approximately 45 minutes for injecting each additional 100 cm^{3} volume of breast-filler fat. The technique for injecting fat grafts for breast augmentation allows the plastic surgeon great control in sculpting the breasts to the required contour, especially in the correction of tuberous breast deformity. In which case, no fat-graft is emplaced beneath the nipple-areola complex (NAC), and the skin envelope of the breast is selectively expanded (contoured) with subcutaneously emplaced body-fat, immediately beneath the skin. Such controlled contouring selectively increased the proportional volume of the breast in relation to the size of the nipple-areola complex, and thus created a breast of natural form and appearance; greater verisimilitude than is achieved solely with breast implants. The fat-corrected, breast-implant deformities, were inadequate soft-tissue coverage of the implant(s) and capsular contracture, achieved with subcutaneous fat-grafts that hid the implant-device edges and wrinkles, and decreased the palpability of the underlying breast implant. Furthermore, grafting autologous fat around the breast implant can result in softening the breast capsule.

==== External tissue expansion ====
The successful outcome of fat-graft breast augmentation is enhanced by achieving a pre-expanded recipient site to create the breast-tissue matrix that will receive grafts of autologous adipocyte fat. The recipient site is expanded with an external vacuum tissue-expander applied upon each breast. The biological effect of negative pressure (vacuum) expansion upon soft tissues derives from the ability of soft tissues to grow when subjected to controlled, distractive, mechanical forces. (see distraction osteogenesis) The study reported the technical effectiveness of recipient-site pre-expansion. In a single-group study, 17 healthy women (aged 18–40 years) wore a brassiere-like vacuum system that applied a 20-mmHg vacuum (controlled, mechanical, distraction force) to each breast for 10–12 hours daily for 10 weeks. Pre- and post-procedure, the breast volume (size) was periodically measured; likewise, a magnetic resonance image (MRI) of the breast-tissue architecture and water density was taken during the same phase of the patient's menstrual cycle; of the 17-woman study group, 12 completed the study, and 5 withdrew, because of non-compliance with the clinical trial protocol.

The breast volume (size) of all 17 women increased throughout the 10-week treatment period, the greatest increment was at week 10 (final treatment) – the average volume increase was 98+/–67 percent over the initial breast-size measures. Incidences of partial recoil occurred at 1-week post-procedure, with no further, significant, breast volume decrease afterwards, nor at the follow-up treatment at 30-weeks post-procedure. The stable, long-term increase in breast size was 55 percent (range 15–115%). The MRI visualizations of the breasts showed no edema, and confirmed the proportionate enlargement of the adipose and glandular components of the breast-tissue matrices. Furthermore, a statistically significant decrease in body weight occurred during the study, and self-esteem questionnaire scores improved from the initial-measure scores.

Because external vacuum expansion of the recipient-site tissues permits injecting large-volume fat grafts (+300 cc) to correct defects and enhance the bust, the histologic viability of the breast filler (adipocyte fat) and its volume must be monitored and maintained. The long-term, volume maintenance data reported in Breast Augmentation using Pre-expansion and Autologous Fat Transplantation: a Clinical Radiological Study (2010) indicate the technical effectiveness of external tissue expansion of the recipient site for a 25-patient study group, who had 46 breasts augmented with fat grafts. The indications included micromastia (underdevelopment), explantation deformity (empty implant pocket), and congenital defects (tuberous breast deformity, Poland's syndrome).

Pre-procedure, every patient used external vacuum expansion of the recipient-site tissues to create a breast tissue matrix to be injected with autologous fat grafts of adipocyte tissue, refined via low G-force centrifugation. Pre- and post-procedure, the breast volumes were measured; the patients underwent pre-procedure and 6-month post-procedure MRI and 3D volumetric imaging examinations. At six months post-procedure, each woman had a significant increase in breast volume, ranging 60–200 percent, per the MRI (n=12) examinations. The size, form, and feel of the breasts was natural; post-procedure MRI examinations revealed no oil cysts or abnormality (neoplasm) in the fat-augmented breasts. Moreover, given the sensitive, biologic nature of breast tissue, periodic MRI and 3-D volumetric imaging examinations are required to monitor the breast-tissue viability and the maintenance of the large volume (+300 cc) fat grafts.

=== Post-mastectomy procedures ===
Surgical post-mastectomy breast reconstruction requires general anaesthesia, cuts the chest muscles, produces new scars, and requires a long post-surgical recovery for the patient. The surgical emplacement of breast implant devices (saline or silicone) introduces a foreign object to the patient's body (see capsular contracture). The TRAM flap (Transverse Rectus Abdominis Myocutaneous flap) procedure reconstructs the breast using an autologous flap of abdominal, cutaneous, and muscle tissues. The latissimus myocutaneous flap employs skin fat and muscle harvested from the back, and a breast implant. The DIEP flap (Deep Inferior Epigastric Perforators) procedure uses an autologous flap of abdominal skin and fat tissue.

==== Post-mastectomy fat-graft reconstruction ====
The reconstruction of the breast(s) with grafts of autologous fat is a non-implant alternative to further surgery after a breast cancer surgery, be it a lumpectomy or a breast removal – simple (total) mastectomy, radical mastectomy, modified radical mastectomy, skin-sparing mastectomy, and subcutaneous (nipple sparing) mastectomy. The breast is reconstructed by first applying external tissue expansion to the recipient-site tissues (adipose, glandular) to create a breast-tissue matrix that can be injected with autologous fat grafts (adipocyte tissue); the reconstructed breast has a natural form, look, and feel, and is generally sensate throughout and in the nipple-areola complex (NAC). The reconstruction of breasts with fat grafts requires a three-month treatment period – begun after 3–5 weeks of external vacuum expansion of the recipient-site tissues. The autologous breast-filler fat is harvested by liposuction from the patient's body (buttocks, thighs, abdomen), is refined and then is injected (grafted) to the breast-tissue matrices (recipient sites), where the fat will thrive.

One method of non-implant breast reconstruction is initiated at the concluding steps of the breast cancer surgery, wherein the oncological surgeon is joined by the reconstructive plastic surgeon, who immediately begins harvesting, refining, and seeding (injecting) fat grafts to the post-mastectomy recipient site. After that initial post-mastectomy fat-graft seeding in the operating room, the patient leaves hospital with a slight breast mound that has been seeded to become the foundation tissue matrix for the breast reconstruction. Then, after 3–5 weeks of continual external vacuum expansion of the breast mound (seeded recipient-site) – to promote the histologic regeneration of the extant tissues (fat, glandular) via increased blood circulation to the mastectomy scar (suture site) – the patient formally undergoes the first fat-grafting session for the reconstruction of her breasts. The external vacuum expansion of the breast mound created an adequate, vascularised, breast-tissue matrix to which the autologous fat is injected; and, per the patient, such reconstruction affords almost-normal sensation throughout the breast and the nipple-areola complex. Patient recovery from non-surgical fat graft breast reconstruction permits her to resume normal life activities at 3-days post-procedure.

==== Tissue engineering ====
===== The breast mound =====
The breast-tissue matrix consists of engineered tissues of complex, implanted, biocompatible scaffolds seeded with the appropriate cells. The in-situ creation of a tissue matrix in the breast mound is begun with the external vacuum expansion of the mastectomy defect tissues (recipient site), for subsequent seeding (injecting) with autologous fat grafts of adipocyte tissue. A 2010 study, reported that serial fat-grafting to a pre-expanded recipient site achieved (with a few 2-mm incisions and minimally invasive blunt-cannula injection procedures), a non-implant outcome equivalent to a surgical breast reconstruction by autologous-flap procedure. Technically, the external vacuum expansion of the recipient-site tissues created a skin envelope as it stretched the mastectomy scar, and so generated a fertile breast-tissue matrix to which were injected large-volume fat grafts (150–600 ml) to create a breast of natural form, look, and feel.

The fat graft breast reconstructions for 33 women (47 breasts, 14 irradiated), whose clinical statuses ranged from zero days to 30 years post-mastectomy, began with the pre-expansion of the breast mound (recipient site) with an external vacuum tissue-expander for 10 hours daily, for 10–30 days before the first grafting of autologous fat. The breast mound expansion was adequate when the mastectomy scar tissues stretched to create a 200–300 ml recipient matrix (skin envelope), that received a fat-suspension volume of 150–600 ml in each grafting session.

At one week post-procedure, the patients resumed using the external vacuum tissue-expander for 10 hours daily, until the next fat grafting session; 2–5 outpatient procedures, 6–16 weeks apart, were required until the plastic surgeon and the patient were satisfied with the volume, form, and feel of the reconstructed breasts. The follow-up mammogram and MRI examinations found neither defects (necrosis) nor abnormalities (neoplasms). At six months post-procedure, the reconstructed breasts had a natural form, look, and feel, and the stable breast-volumes ranged 300–600 ml per breast. The post-procedure mammographies indicated normal, fatty breasts with well-vascularized fat, and few, scattered, benign oil cysts. The occurred complications included pneumothorax and transient cysts.

===== Explantation deformity =====
The autologous fat graft replacement of breast implants (saline and silicone) resolves medical complications such as: capsular contracture, implant shell rupture, filler leakage (silent rupture), device deflation, and silicone-induced granulomas, which are medical conditions usually requiring re-operation and explantation (breast implant removal). The patient then has the option of surgical or non-implant breast corrections, either replacement of the explanted breast implants or fat-graft breast augmentation. Moreover, because fat-grafts are biologically sensitive, they cannot survive in the empty implantation pocket, instead, they are injected to and diffused within the breast-tissue matrix (recipient site), replacing approximately 50% of the volume of the removed implant – as permanent breast augmentation. The outcome of the explantation correction is a bust of natural appearance; breasts of volume, form, and feel, that – although approximately 50% smaller than the explanted breast size – are larger than the original breast size, pre-procedure.

===== Breast augmentation =====
The outcome of a breast augmentation with fat-graft injections depends upon proper patient selection, preparation, and correct technique for recipient site expansion, and the harvesting, refining, and injecting of the autologous breast filler fat. Technical success follows the adequate external vacuum expansion of the recipient-site tissues (matrix) before the injection of large-volume grafts (220–650 cc) of autologous fat to the breasts. After harvesting by liposuction, the breast-filler fat was obtained by low G-force syringe centrifugation of the harvested fat to separate it, by density, from the crystalloid component. The refined breast filler then was injected to the pre-expanded recipient site; post-procedure, the patient resumed continual vacuum expansion therapy upon the injected breast, until the next fat grafting session. The mean operating room (OR) time was 2-hours, and there occurred no incidences of infection, cysts, seroma, hematoma, or tissue necrosis.

The breast-volume data reported in Breast Augmentation with Autologous Fat Grafting: A Clinical Radiological Study (2010) indicated a mean increase of 1.2 times the initial breast volume, at six months post-procedure. In a two-year period, 25 patients underwent breast augmentation by fat graft injection; at three weeks pre-procedure, before the fat grafting to the breast-tissue matrix (recipient site), the patients were photographed, and examined via intravenous contrast MRI or 3-D volumetric imaging, or both. The breast-filler fat was harvested by liposuction (abdomen, buttocks, thighs), and yielded fat-graft volumes of 220–650 cm^{3} per breast. At six months post-procedure, the follow-up treatment included photographs, intravenous contrast MRI or 3-D volumetric imaging, or both. Each woman had an increased breast volume of 250 cm^{3} per breast, a mean volume increase confirmed by quantitative MRI analysis. The mean increase in breast volume was 1.2 times the initial breast volume measurements; the statistical difference between the pre-procedure and the six-month post-procedure breast volumes was (P< 00.0000007); the percentage increase basis of the breast volume was 60–80% of the initial, pre-procedure breast volume.

== Medical complications and limitations ==
The Chinese study Breast Augmentation by Autologous Fat-injection Grafting: Management and Clinical analysis of Complications (2009) reported a reduced incidence of medical complications with strict control of the rate of injection (cm^{3}/min) of the volume of breast-filler by injecting the fat-grafts in even layers within the breast-tissue matrix. The small (2-mm.) incision and blunt-cannula injections reduce the possibility of damaging the underlying structures of the breast (milk ducts, blood vessels, nerves). Injected fat-tissue grafts that do not establish an adequate blood supply can undergo necrosis from lack of oxygen and result in oil cysts that will become calcified.

The medical complications (sclerotic lesions, and breast disease) occurred to the 17-patient group were identified and located with X-ray computed tomography and MRI visualizations of the breast tissues. The sclerotic lesion was excised and the liquefied fat was evacuated; the excised samples indicated biological changes in the intramammary fat grafts, such as fat necrosis, fat calcification, fat hyalinization, and fibroplasia.

=== Technical limitations ===
When the patient's body has insufficient adipocyte tissue to harvest as injectable breast filler, a combination of fat grafting and breast implants might provide the desired outcome. Although non-surgical breast augmentation with fat graft injections is not associated with implant-related medical complications (filler leakage, deflation, visibility, palpability, capsular contracture), the achievable breast volumes are physically limited; the large-volume, global bust augmentations realised with breast implants are not possible with the method of structural fat grafting. Global breast augmentation contrasts with the controlled breast augmentation of fat-graft injection, in the degree of control that the plastic surgeon has in achieving the desired breast contour and volume. The controlled augmentation is realised by infiltrating and diffusing the fat grafts throughout the breast; and it is feather-layered into the adjacent pectoral areas until achieving the desired outcome of breast volume and contour. Nonetheless, the physical fullness-of-breast achieved with injected fat-grafts does not visually translate into the type of buxom fullness achieved with breast implants; hence, patients who had plentiful fat-tissue to harvest attained a maximum breast augmentation of one bra cup size in one session of fat grafting to the breast.

==== Therapy ====
Breast augmentation via autologous fat grafts allows the oncological breast surgeon to consider conservative breast surgery procedures that usually are precluded by the presence of alloplastic breast implants, e.g. lumpectomy, if cancer is detected in an implant-augmented breast. In previously augmented patients, aesthetic outcomes cannot be ensured without removing the implant and performing mastectomy. Moreover, radiotherapy treatment is critical to reducing cancerous recurrence and to the maximal conservation of breast tissue; yet, radiotherapy of an implant-augmented breast much increases the incidence of medical complications – capsular contracture, infection, extrusion, and poor cosmetic outcome.

==== Post-cancer breast reconstruction ====
After mastectomy, surgical breast reconstruction with autogenous skin flaps and with breast implants can produce subtle deformities and deficiencies resultant from such global breast augmentation, thus the breast reconstruction is incomplete. In which case, fat graft injection can provide the missing coverage and fullness, and might relax the breast capsule. The fat can be injected as either large grafts or as small grafts, as required to correct difficult axillary deficiencies, improper breast contour, visible implant edges, capsular contracture, and tissue damage consequent to radiation therapy.

== The patient ==
=== Psychology ===
The psychological studies Body Image Concerns of Breast Augmentation Patients (2003) and Body Dysmorphic Disorder and Cosmetic Surgery (2006) indicate that women who seek breast-augmentation surgery usually have a mental-health background that features treatments of psychotherapy, who suffer many occurrences low self-esteem and of psychological depression, in comparison with the general population of women. Moreover, women who sought breast augmentation also suffered body dysmorphia, which is an extreme dissatisfaction and preoccupation with perceived physical defects in her personal appearance, which misperceptions often lead to significant impairment of her mental ability to function socially.

Post-operative patient surveys about the mental health and the quality of life of the women, reported improved physical health, physical appearance, social life, self-confidence, self-esteem, and satisfaction with sexual functioning. Furthermore, most of the women reported long-term satisfaction with their breast implants; some despite having had medical complications that required surgical revision, either corrective or aesthetic. In Denmark, 8.0 percent of breast augmentation patients had a pre-operative history of psychiatric hospitalization.

=== Women bodybuilders ===
The Cosmeticsurgery.com article They Need Bosoms, too – Women Weight Lifters (2013) reported that women weight-lifters have resorted to breast augmentation surgery to maintain a feminine physique, and so compensate for the loss of breast mass consequent to the increased lean-body mass and decreased body-fat consequent to lifting weights.

=== Mental health ===
The longitudinal study Excess Mortality from Suicide and other External Causes of Death Among Women with Cosmetic Breast Implants (2007), reported that women who sought breast implants are almost 3.0 times as likely to die by suicide as are women who have not sought breast implants. Compared to the standard suicide-rate for women of the general populace, the suicide-rate for women with augmented breasts remained alike until 10-years post-implantation, yet it increased to 4.5 times greater at the 11-year mark, and so remained until the 19-year mark, when it increased to 6.0 times greater at 20-years post-implantation. Moreover, additional to the suicide risk, women with breast implants also faced a 3 times greater death risk from alcoholism and drug abuse (prescription and recreational). Although seven studies have found correlation between undergoing a breast augmentation procedure to a greater suicide rate in women, the research indicates that augmentation surgery does not increase the suicide risk. It is the psychopathologically afflicted woman who is likelier to undergo breast augmentation.

Moreover, the study Effects of Breast Augmentation Mammoplasty on Self-Esteem and Sexuality: A Quantitative Analysis (2007), reported that the women attributed their improved self-esteem, self-image, and increased, satisfactory sexual functioning to having undergone breast augmentation; the cohort, aged 21–57 years, averaged post-operative self-esteem increases ranging from 20.7 to 24.9 points on the 30-point Rosenberg self-esteem scale. Therefore, before agreeing to any surgical procedure, the plastic surgeon evaluates and considers the woman's mental health to determine if breast implants can positively affect her self-esteem and sexual functioning.

== Bibliography ==
- Schiffman MA (2010). Autologous Fat Transfer: Art, Science, and Clinical Practice. Berlin, Heidelberg: Springer. ISBN 978-3-642-00472-8.
- Mary White Stewart MD (2012). Silicone Spills: Breast Implants on Trial. Santa Barbara, CA: Praeger. ISBN 978-0-275-96359-0.
