= SPAIR =

Short-scar periareolar inferior pedicle reduction
- Procedure: Short-scar breast surgery technique
- Developer: Dennis C. Hammond

SPAIR (short-scar periareolar inferior pedicle reduction) is a short-scar breast surgery technique developed by Dennis C. Hammond, assistant professor of surgery at Michigan State University. The technique was designed to allow a better-shaped breast, a limited amount of scarring, and a more accelerated healing process, by eliminating the lateral scar beneath the breast found in conventional breast reduction surgery. The technique is considered to be a good alternative to vertical mammoplasty.

Short-scar refers to the smaller, shorter (when compared to conventional breast reduction methods), vertical-only scar. Periareolar refers to the cutting around the areola and running vertically down to the underside of the breast. Inferior Pedicle refers to leaving the nipple attached on the inside of the breast. (The inferior pedicle is the standard pedicle used in all breast reduction surgeries to preserve nipple function (breast feeding and sensitivity), not just SPAIR.)

== SPAIR versus traditional breast reduction ==
Conventional breast reduction procedures typically result in a long scar which runs laterally along the underside of the breast from the chest wall to the mid-portion of the sternum. Additional scarring can be found up the center of the breast and around the nipple and areola. This operation successfully reduces the size of the breast, but is often associated with pronounced or hypertrophic scarring. Also, the shape created at the time of surgery is often lost due to a large portion of the glandular tissue settling down below the nipple areola complex and the inframammary fold, creating what is referred to as a "bottomed-out" appearance.
