= Chest surgery =

Chest surgery may refer to:

- Thoracic surgery
- Breast surgery
