= DIEP flap =

Type of breast reconstruction

- Specialty: Plastic surgery

A DIEP flap (/ˈdiːp/, DEEP) is type of autologous breast reconstruction in which skin, fat, and blood vessels from the lower abdomen are transferred to the chest to reconstruct the breast following mastectomy. DIEP stands for the deep inferior epigastric perforator artery, which runs through the abdomen.

== Overview ==
The DIEP flap reconstruction procedure is similar to the muscle-sparing TRAM flap procedure, and requires the removal of skin, fat, and blood vessels. Unlike in the TRAM procedure, however, no muscle is sacrificed. The DIEP flap—like the TRAM flap—requires an incision into the abdominal (rectus) muscle, as the blood vessels, or perforators, required to keep the tissue alive lie just beneath or within this muscle. Therefore, a small incision is made in the abdominal muscle in order to access the vessels.

After the skin, tissues and perforators (collectively known as the "flap") have been dissected, the flap is transplanted and connected to the patient's chest using microsurgery. The plastic surgeon then shapes the flap to create the new breast. As no abdominal muscle is removed or transferred to the breast, patients typically see a lower risk of losing abdominal muscle strength and may experience a faster recovery compared to TRAM flap patients. Studies comparing abdominal results with the muscle-sparing free TRAM and the DIEP show that abdominal wall hernias occur less frequently in DIEP patients, although the abdominal wall bulge rates are similar for both procedures.

The removal of lower abdominal tissue may result in a flatter abdominal contour, an effect sometimes compared to abdominoplasty. However, one risk of these procedures is the potential denervation of the abdominal musculature following the DIEP dissection. Operative time varies but is typically longer than implant-based reconstruction, with reported durations ranging from six to eight hours or more in complex cases.

DIEP flap breast reconstruction is typically performed by the plastic surgery team (rather than the breast surgery team) so is only available in centers with plastic surgery support. The procedure is technically more complex than some other reconstructive options, and has been associated in some studies with favorable cosmetic outcomes and patient-reported satisfaction. Recent advances in preoperative imaging of the blood vessels in the abdomen (using CT or MRI scans), operative time and complication rates can be reduced in DIEP flap breast reconstruction.

== Procedure description ==
DIEP flap surgery is a type of breast reconstruction after a mastectomy of a single or both breasts by using abdominal fat, skin, and blood vessels from the patient's own body.

=== Natural breast tissue ===
Because the reconstructed breast consists of the patient’s own tissue, changes in body weight may affect breast volume. Hospital stay is typically longer than for implant-based reconstruction due to postoperative flap monitoring.

=== Timing of the reconstruction ===
The operation can be performed at the time of the mastectomy (immediate breast reconstruction) or at a later time point (delayed breast reconstruction). Reasons to delay the operation include: surgeon preference, patient preference, advanced tumor requiring radiation therapy and/or chemotherapy, or because of a complication with an immediate breast reconstruction. The DIEP flap, because it can restore both the surface area and volume of a breast, is ideal for both immediate and delayed breast reconstruction.

=== Recovery ===
Recovery from a DIEP flap happens in stages. Most patients leave the hospital in approximately 4 days, feel capable of doing most activities on their own after 3–4 weeks, and have no surgical restrictions by 6–8 weeks. Most patients are able to return to normal activities in 3–4 months.

=== Abdominoplasty ===
The harvesting of abdominal fat and belly skin generally provides an aesthetic benefit to the abdomen. It is often likened to an abdominoplasty or "tummy tuck", but the two procedures have notable differences.

==== Similarities to an abdominoplasty ====
- Tissue removed: Excess abdominal adipose tissue and skin are removed in both procedures while also preserving the abdominal muscles. Upper abdominal skin is stretched taut to close the incision. The belly button is reattached through a new opening.
- Incision pattern: Both procedures remove a football-shaped area of skin and fat resulting in a hip-to-hip scar. The scar is often low enough to be hidden by underwear, but some DIEP patients end up with a higher than ideal scar due to their anatomical tissue distribution needed for the breast reconstruction.
- Aesthetic results: All patients generally benefit from a flatter abdomen and improved waist contour.

==== Differences from an abdominoplasty ====
- Abdominal wall tightening: A hallmark of the tummy tuck is that surgeons use internal sutures to close the separation of the rectus abdominis muscles (diastasis recti). This creates a smooth and firm result. This is not always a part of DIEP flap breast reconstruction and varies by surgeon.
- Surgeon training: DIEP flap surgery requires the expertise of highly trained microsurgeons who are skilled in harvesting blood vessels and sensory nerves. No special care for blood vessels or sensory nerves is necessary for a tummy tuck, and standard trained plastic surgeons are capable of that procedure.
- Purpose of procedure: A tummy tuck is a cosmetic procedure used to give the abdomen a slimmer appearance. DIEP flap reconstruction is procedure that reconstructs breasts after a single or double mastectomy due to breast cancer.
- Length of surgery/hospital stay: A DIEP flap reconstruction surgery takes about six to eight hours on average. If the mastectomy is performed during the same procedure, the length of time will be hours longer. Patients recovering from DIEP flap reconstruction remain in the hospital for several days. A tummy tuck typically takes about three hours. It is often an out-patient procedure with no need for the patient to stay overnight in the hospital.

Compared to a standard tummy tuck where excess abdominal skin and fat are removed, the DIEP flap procedure involves a longer recovery time as significant surgery is performed to the two vertical abdominal Rectus muscles in the process of careful "scratching" and finding the tiny blood vessel or "perforators" required to provide blood supply to the fat tissues. These are the "sit up" muscles or also known as the 6-pack muscles. They are essential muscles of the abdominal core and take some time to heal. Seven percent of patients reported long-term abdominal muscle weakness. Less than 4% of DIEP flap patients displayed clinically significant abdominal bulge, or hernia occurred. The reasons for this vary, though wound healing issues and sacrificing nerves seem to be correlated with increased incidence of an abdominal bulge or hernia. A corrective surgery placing supportive mesh can be performed to provide strength to the abdominal wall if needed.

=== Breast lift ===
Another benefit of this operation is that both breast are given a breast lift. This will leave permanent scarring. The extent and placement of the incisions and scars varies according to preference and skill of the surgeon. The lift is achieved by reattaching the nipple higher up on the breast and removing excess skin. The usually ample amount of tummy fat allows to the surgeon to give the patient an increase in breast size for women with smaller breasts.

=== Once-off operation ===
DIEP flap reconstruction can be performed once only. In the case of a single mastectomy, the second breast cannot be rebuilt at a later time with a flap of fat tissue from the belly. For this reason, some patients may choose to perform a mastectomy and DIEP flap reconstruction on the non-cancerous breast at the same time to reduce the chance of later development of cancer and improve the overall reconstruction outcome.

=== Areolae and nipples ===
Unless a nipple sparing mastectomy was performed, the areola and nipple of the cancerous breast is discarded in this operation. If the patient chooses, new nipples and areolae are formed as a follow-up procedure through surgery and a tattoo process. Some women are satisfied without a nipple and choose to forgo nipple reconstruction and areola tattoo process.

=== Loss of sensation ===
Sensation in the nipples, much of the breast and an area surrounding the tummy tuck scar is significantly less after this operation, as microsurgery is routinely focused on vascular supply leaving the nerves untreated. Although it is more technically challenging, cutaneous sensation can potentially be restored by identifying and connecting intercostal nerve branches.
