= Tuberous breasts =

- A pair of tuberous breasts displaying typical characteristics such as minimal breast tissue and enlarged, puffy areola
- Specialty: Plastic surgery
- Complications: low milk production
- Usual onset: puberty
- Duration: life
- Prognosis: benign
- Frequency: unknown

Tuberous breasts (or tubular breasts) are a result of a congenital abnormality of the breasts which can occur in both men and women (also see Hypoplasia), one breast or both. During puberty breast development is stymied and the breasts fail to develop normally and fully. The exact cause of this is as yet unclear; however, a study in 2011 of the cells in the breasts of both males and females with tubular breasts suggested a genetic link in a disorder of collagen deposition. The condition is thought to affect one to five percent of breast augmentation patients; however, the proportion of the general population affected is unknown as surgery is not always sought.

== Background ==
The tuberous breast deformity was first described by Rees and Aston in 1976 following which a method of classifying the severity was developed. The surgical classifications refer to which areas of the breast are affected and is divided into three grades; mainly in the inferomedial quadrant (Grade I); in the two inferior quadrants (Grade II); or affecting the whole breast (Grade III).

This condition is also known as constricted breasts, tubular breasts, or herniated areolar complexes.

== Effects ==
Tuberous breasts are not simply small or underdeveloped breasts. The effect of the condition on the appearance of the breast can range from mild to severe, and typical characteristics include enlarged, puffy areola, unusually wide spacing between the breasts, minimal breast tissue, sagging, higher than normal breast fold, and narrow base at the chest wall. The condition can cause low milk supply in breastfeeding women. However, other physical aspects of fertility and pregnancy are not affected by the condition.

== Treatment ==
The appearance of tuberous breasts can potentially be changed through surgical procedures, including the tissue expansion method, use of autologous fat grafting and breast implants. Depending on the extent of the tuberous breasts, a surgeon will release the constricted tissue and create a new breast fold.

The procedure to change the appearance of tuberous breasts can be more complicated than a regular breast augmentation, and some plastic surgeons have specialist training in tuberous breast augmentation. A less complicated single-stage approach using saline implants can also provide a similar result. As treatment for tuberous breasts is desired for some women, referral for treatment under the National Health Service may be possible in the United Kingdom. For those seeking non-surgical solutions, counseling may be recommended as a way of coming to terms with body image.
