= Breast hematoma =

Breast hematoma is a collection of blood within the breast. It arises from internal bleeding (hemorrhage) and may arise due to trauma (breast injury or surgery) or due to a non-traumatic cause.

== Symptoms ==
Symptoms may include visible discoloring (ecchymosis), breast pain, and swelling.

The symptoms may be similar to those of fibrocystic breast changes.

== Causes ==
A breast hematoma may appear due to direct trauma to the breast, e.g. a sports injury or car accident. Hematomas can also result from breast surgery, usually due to post-operative bleeding or, less frequently, from a breast biopsy.

Breast hematomas can occur spontaneously from a rupture of blood vessels in the breast, especially in individuals with coagulopathy, or after long-term use of blood-thinning drugs such as aspirin or ibuprofen.

== Pathophysiology ==
Small breast hematomas often resolve on their own within several days or weeks by means of reabsorption of the blood. Larger hematomas are more likely to lead to inflammation or fibrosis.

Breast hematomas can sometimes lead to skin discoloration, inflammation, or fever. When a hematoma resolves, it may become fibrotic, leaving behind scar tissue. A resolving hematoma may liquify to form a seroma.

Post-surgical breast hematomas can also impede wound healing and therefore impact the cosmetic outcome. Hematomas are furthermore one of the risk factors for breast surgical site infections. There is preliminary evidence that, after breast implant surgery, the presence of hematoma increases the risk of developing capsular contracture.

In mammography screening, scar tissue resulting from a breast hematoma can easily be confused with tumor tissue, especially in the first years following surgery. Ultimately, fat necrosis may occur in the concerned region of the breast.

== Diagnosis ==
When there is post-operative swelling after breast surgery or core needle biopsy, a breast ultrasound examination may be indicated in order to differentiate between a hematoma and other possible post-surgical complications such as abscess or seroma, A recent hematoma is usually visible in a mammogram. and it also shows typical signal intensities on MR imaging. If a differentiation from breast cancer is necessary, a hematoma biopsy may be indicated.

A careful consideration of the case history is important for the diagnosis of a breast hematoma.

== Treatment ==
Small breast hematomas that cause no discomfort often require merely clinical observation, with ultrasound being used to monitor the resolution of the hematoma.

Large breast hematomas, or those that are not becoming smaller or that are causing discomfort, usually require drainage. Also hematomas that occur after surgery for excision of a malignant tumor are drained, because a hematoma to which irradiation is applied is unlikely to ever resolve. A recent hematoma can be drained by means of needle aspiration or (rarely) open surgical drainage.
