= Nipple-sparing mastectomy =

Breast cancer treating method

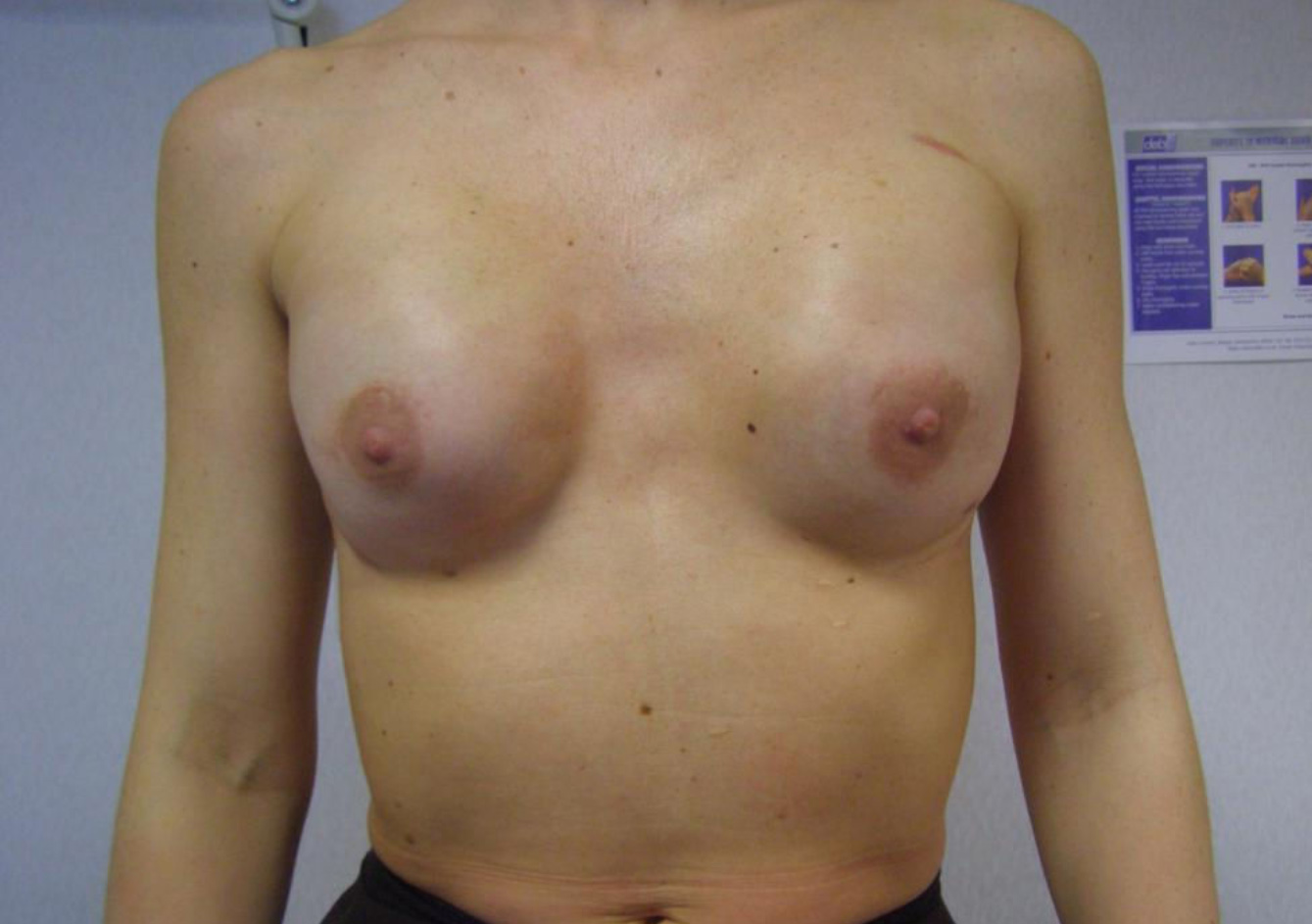
Woman after nipple-sparing mastectomy and implant reconstruction

Nipple-sparing mastectomy (NSM), is the surgical removal of the breast that preserves the overlying skin envelope and nipple areolar complex (NAC). NSM is an option for the surgical treatment of breast cancer, and it can also be part of a protocol of risk reduction, called prophylactic mastectomy. When the breast tissue is removed, the NAC is preserved on the skin envelope by maintaining its blood supply from the surrounding skin. By preserving the NAC, NSM may provide patients with better cosmetic outcomes and the option to undergo a mastectomy while maintaining a more natural appearance.

The concept and technique of NSM were originally introduced by Freeman in the 1960s. This technique has offered a viable alternative for patients who prioritize cosmetic outcomes, taking into consideration factors such as tumour size, breast size, and the presence of inflammatory signs.

At the beginning of the surgery, various incision methods can be performed. Followed by flap dissection for removal of the breast tissue, NAC is preserved during the whole procedure. Breast reconstruction options, such as implant-based or flap-based reconstruction, can be pursued at last. After the surgery, proper monitoring of blood pressure and psychological support are needed.

NSM is generally safe involving a low risk of necrosis of the NAC or surrounding skin due to interruptions of blood supply to it. Necrosis has been reported from 6%-30% of patients. The increased rates have an association with risk factors, including ptotic breasts, periareolar scars, large cup size, and previous radiation.

== History ==
The concept and technique of NSM were first described by Freeman in 1962. The procedure was fraught with complications, unsatisfying cosmetic outcomes, and concerns about its oncologic safety. It was thus not widely accepted by surgeons. After the identification of the BRCA gene in the 1990s, together with the reintroduction by Hartmann et al. in their published research, the procedure regained popularity. The bulk of the study's patients had undergone NSM, and only 1% of them went on to acquire breast cancer subsequently. Whether the nipple was removed or kept, there was no difference in risk reduction.

However, the suitability of NSM for individuals with excessively large or ptotic breasts has been a topic of debate. In 2009, Spear et al. conducted an initial study and concluded that NSM should not be offered to such patients. Nevertheless, in the same year, a critique of Spear challenged this conclusion by presenting a case of a patient with macromastia who underwent NSM safely following a pre-mastectomy delay procedure.

In 2020, Jay Arthur Jensen presented a new strategy that combines NSM with subtotal mastectomy. This approach not only achieves post-mastectomy nipple positioning but also avoids the potential drawbacks associated with a separate reduction mammoplasty followed by NSM or a specialized delay procedure. Importantly, all patients undergo full oncologic mastectomies, ensuring that nipple sparing can be achieved in this high-risk group within two procedures without compromising oncologic safety.

== Indication ==
=== Therapeutic candidate ===
Patients suffering from benign or malignant breast cancer can receive NSM treatment. The goal of NSM is to obtain negative margins and achieve a satisfying cosmetic outcome at the same time. NSM was ideally aimed at small breast cancer where the location of tumour is far away from the Nipple Areolar Complex (NAC), and without clinical lymph node involvement. Selection of NSM candidates is based on preoperative and intraoperative assessment.

==== Preoperative assessment ====
===== Patients who have =====
- undergone tumour margin evaluation by using radiological distance (mammogram or MRI)
- a tumour size smaller than 3 cm
- a distance between tumour and NAC farther than 2 cm
- tumour located outside of the areola area
- no nipple retraction
- no blood discharge from the nipple
- no inflammatory signs
- no previous irradiation and no micro calcifications on radiologic assessment
- no or minimal ptosis (grade 0 or 1)
- A or B cup breast size
- a BMI < 30 kg/m^{2}

===== Patients with =====
- bilateral cancer
- benign tumour
- preoperative radio- or chemotherapy

===== Patients who are not active smokers =====
are recommended to receive this surgery.

Nonetheless, patients with contraindications have shown positive results when using some of the more recent approaches to these difficult cases. NSM is now feasible even for patients with different contraindications. Currently, only women with inflammatory signs and nipple involvement are the absolute contraindications for conducting an NSM.

==== Intraoperative assessment ====
Patients will undergo a frozen section examination of retroareolar tissue during the operation. The intraoperative frozen section is highly specific and moderately sensitive for identifying positive sub-areolar biopsies in NSM. The examination can act as a guide for intraoperative reconstructive planning. The importance of conducting sub-areolar biopsies in all nipple-sparing mastectomies can be shown by the existence of positive sub-areolar biopsies in contralateral and high-risk prophylactic mastectomy specimens.

=== Prophylactic cndidate ===
High risk genetic mutations BRCA1 and BRCA2 carriers can receive preventative mastectomy as a risk-reduction treatment. The operation can reduce their overall risk of developing future breast cancer by more than 90%.

== Technique ==
There are various ways of incision. The selection of incision methods depends on the skin perfusion and cosmetic factors.

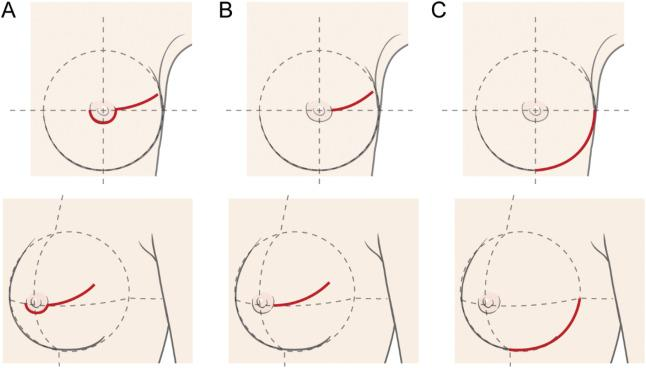
Incisions in nipple-sparing mastectomy (A: periareolar, B: radial, C: inframammary fold)

=== Inframammary fold (IMF) incision ===
This is the most common incision approach. An approximately 9 cm incision is performed inferiorly to the nipple. It then extends laterally along the IMF. The incision can be displaced 4 cm medially if the internal mammary arteries are desired as the recipient vessel for autologous reconstruction.

=== Vertical radial incision ===
A vertical radial incision extends from the bottom of the areola border to the inframammary fold. This incision is preferable by plastic surgeons as it allows upward positioning of the nipple for ptosis correction.

=== Circumareolar with lateral extension incision ===
The incision is performed around the button half portion of the areolar border to the inframammary fold laterally. This approach is preferred by surgeons who routinely perform skin-sparing mastectomies via circumareolar incision.

=== Preexisting scars incision ===
NSM can be performed through preexisting incision for prevention of additional scarring.

After incision, mastectomy flap dissection is performed. Exposure is created by retraction of the skin flap with counter-tension by countertraction of the breast gland. This technique allows better visualization and access to the underlying breast tissue. Breast and ductal tissues are removed from the chest wall and the pectoralis muscle, including the pectoralis fascia. Through the whole procedure, the NAC is preserved by dissecting the tissues away from the underlying structures to maintain the blood supply and nerve connections to the nipple.

Any breast reconstruction approaches, including implant-based reconstruction and flap-based reconstruction, may be done after the surgery. Implant-based reconstructions are most commonly selected as they allow the rebuilding of a moderate size of breast. Flap-based reconstruction utilizes autologous tissue, such as muscle or subcutaneous from alternative body regions for reconstructing the breast mound.

== Postoperative management ==
=== Physical ===
Monitoring of blood pressure is vital after the surgery. If any hypotensive situation occurs in patients, intravascular fluid injection is required for replenishment of blood pressure. Drugs containing epinephrine should be avoided to prevent vasoconstriction and reduced blood flow through the anastomosis. Physical assessment, such as skin colour, capillary refill time, skin turgor, skin temperature, and sensation of the breast, are used for blood pressure examination at NAC.

==== Nipple sensation preservation ====
Although NSM is seen as a logical approach for preserving the NAC, patients should generally expect a decrease in overall sensation. Maintaining NAC sensation is very important for creating a sense of normalcy post-mastectomy and plays a major role in women's psychological and sexual health, given that the NAC contributes to sexual pleasure. Objective sensory assessments, particularly those that use Semmes-Weinstein monofilaments (SWM), tend to indicate an average loss of protective nipple sensation following the mastectomy compared to patients who did not receive the operation. To address the loss of sensation, neurotization, a process of transferring a healthy nerve to an area where a nerve was damaged or destroyed to reinnervate the area, is a technique used to restore NAC sensory function. This surgery involves connecting intercostal nerves that are laterally transected to the underside of the NAC. The connection is often made through the use of nerve allografts. Research suggests that neurotization can lead to sufficient improvement of NAC sensation and leaves many patients satisfied. Long-term follow-up studies will need to be done, as well as standardized protocols, to ensure that there are definite conclusions about the efficacy of NAC neurotization.

=== Psychological ===
Patients often suffer from depression and anxiety due to the stress of surgery and loss of breast tissue. Mental health education and self-compassion are important as a protective mechanism for body image disturbance and psychological distress. However, this surgical approach provides greater psychological benefits than other mastectomy due to the preservation of the NAC and women's body image.

== Risk and complication ==
NSM has the same perioperative complications as skin-sparing mastectomy and breast reconstruction. One of the most common risks would be necrosis of the NAC and the surrounding skin tissues. This is affected by the oxygenating ability of the breast skin, which relates to the blood supply. The blood supply to the NAC particularly may be interfered with by the NSM. The average rate of partial or full skin flap necrosis is 9.5%. This is likely due to the surgical techniques and patient selection. BMI, breast mass, and sternal notch to nipple length are more adversely affecting the risk of necrosis.

Although breast reconstruction is known to be safe, there might still be some complications, including infection, seroma, hematoma, and capsule contracture.

The risk of NAC necrosis can be reduced by the 'delayed' procedure. It consists of the creation of new circulatory connections from the breast skin to the NAC. In this way, the NAC may no longer be completely dependent on the breast tissue underneath for its blood supply.

As the NAC is preserved, patients may encounter a higher risk of occult NAC tumour. The retroareolar tissue is not removed completely and thus more terminal duct lobular units are left in patient' s body, which induces higher oncological risk.

== Significance ==
The difference between NSM and skin-sparing mastectomy (SSM) is that NSM allows preservation of the NAC but SSM does not. One of the main reasons to preserve the NAC is for patients' satisfaction and psychological benefits. It is a crucial component of the breast, given its aesthetics and contribution to sexual pleasure. Even though the NAC can be reconstructed after performing SSM, the reconstruction is difficult due to the unique appearance of every NAC. Overall, NSM can result in higher sexual and psychosocial well-being.
