= Capsular contracture =

Response of the immune system to foreign materials in the human body

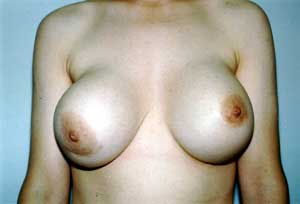
Grade IV capsular contracture in the right breast of a 29 y.o. woman, seven years after subglandular placement of 560cc silicone gel-filled breast implants

Capsular contracture is a response of the immune system to foreign materials in the human body. Medically, it occurs mostly in context of the complications from breast implants and artificial joint prosthetics.

The occurrence of capsular contraction follows the formation of capsules of tightly woven collagen fibers, created by the immune response to the presence of foreign objects surgically installed to the human body, e.g. breast implants, artificial pacemakers, orthopedic prostheses; biological protection by isolation and toleration. Capsular contracture occurs when the collagen-fiber capsule shrinks, tightens and compresses the breast implant, much like the collapse of a bubble gum bubble. It is a medical complication that can be painful and discomforting, and might distort the aesthetics of the breast implant and the breast. Although the cause of capsular contracture is unknown, factors common to its incidence include bacterial contamination, rupture of the breast-implant shell, leakage of the silicone-gel filling, and hematoma.

Moreover, because capsular contracture is a consequence of the immune system defending the patient's bodily integrity and health, it might recur, even after the requisite corrective surgery for the initial incidence. The degree of an incidence of capsular contracture is graded using the four-grade Baker scale:

- Grade I — the breast is normally soft and appears natural in size and shape
- Grade II — the breast is a little firm, but appears normal
- Grade III — the breast is firm and appears abnormal
- Grade IV — the breast is hard, painful to the touch, and appears abnormal

Superior implant malposition may sometimes mimic capsular contracture. A 2026 retrospective series of 209 patients undergoing correction of high-riding saline implants reported macroscopically normal fibrous capsules in all cases, suggesting that some such deformities may be mechanical rather than inflammatory in origin.

The surgical implantation methods that have reduced capsular contracture include submuscular breast implant placement, using either textured or polyurethane-coated implants, limited handling of the implants, minimal contact with the chest wall skin before their insertions, and irrigating the surgical sites with triple-antibiotic solutions. The use of macrotextured implants and polyurethene-coated implants may increase the risk of BIA-ALCL, a rare form of lymphoma associated to the presence of breast implants.

The correction of capsular contracture might require the surgical removal (release) of the capsule, or the removal, and possible replacement, of the breast implant, itself. Closed capsulotomy (disrupting the capsule via external manipulation), a once-common maneuver for treating hard capsules, was discontinued because it might rupture the breast implant. Non-surgical methods of treating capsules include massage, external ultrasound, treatment with leukotriene pathway inhibitors (e.g. Accolate, Singulair), specific dietary supplements and pulsed electromagnetic field therapy.

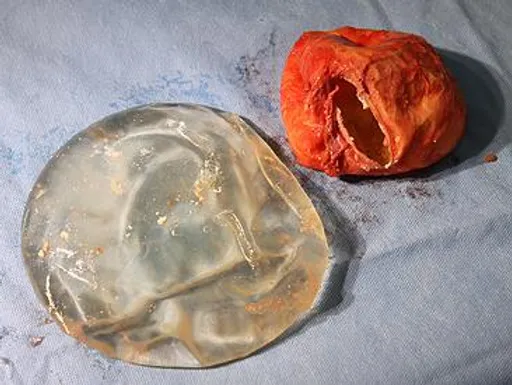
Image taken after a capsular contracture scar tissue removal surgery, showing the removed implant and removed tissue capsule

The Mentor Worldwide LLC corporation, one of the three, U.S. FDA-approved breast-implant device manufacturers, conducted a study of the medical complications suffered by breast implantation surgery patients. In March 2000, at a Food and Drug Administration presentation, the Mentor report indicated that 43 per cent of patients with saline breast implants reported medical complications occurring within three years of the surgery; moreover, 10 per cent of that percentage group complained of capsular contracture.

== Sources ==
- Section on Complications from the FDA Breast Implant Consumer Handbook - 2004. Most of the above text was copied verbatim from this public domain source.
- Safety of Silicone Breast Implants. Institute of Medicine National Academy Press, Washington, D.C. 2000.
- Breast Augmentation and Breast Implants Information Website - ImplantInfo by Nicole
- Breast Augmentation Surgery Risk & Complications Website - BreastAugmentation101
