= Mammaplasty =

Surgically modifying the appearance of the breast

Mammoplasty
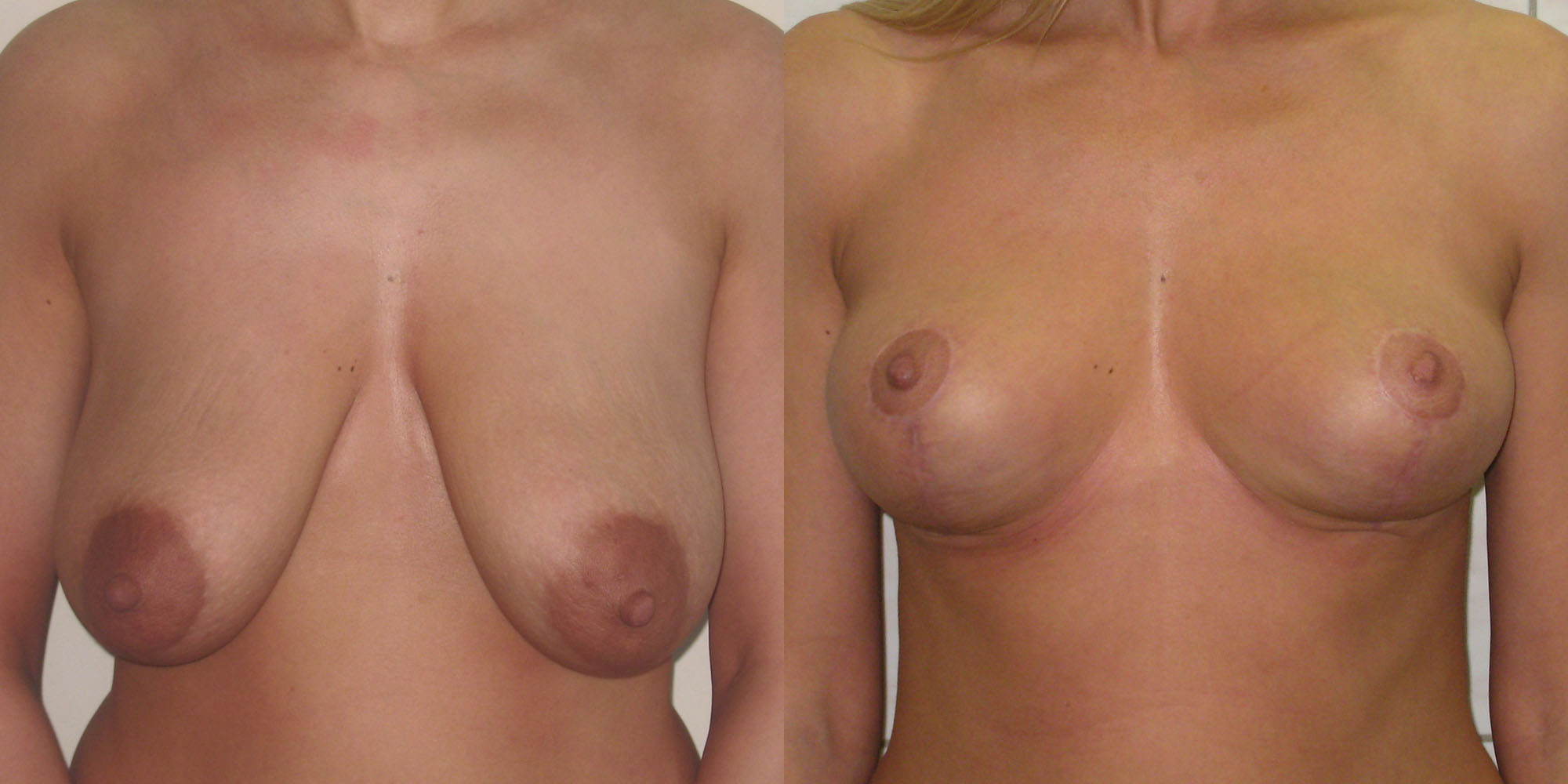
- Before and after mammaplasty
- ICD-9-CM: 85.31-85.32, 85.5
- MeSH: D016462

Mammaplasty (also called mammoplasty or mastoplasty) refers to a group of surgical procedures, the goal of which is to reshape or otherwise modify the appearance of the breast. There are three main types of mammoplasty:

1. Augmentation mammaplasty is commonly performed to increase the size, change the shape, and/or alter the texture of the breasts. This usually involves the surgical implantation of breast implants.
2. Reduction mammaplasty is commonly performed to reduce the size, change the shape, and/or alter the texture of the breasts. This involves the removal of breast tissue.
3. Reconstructive mammoplasty is breast reconstruction that is done after mastectomy to give the breasts an appearance that is more normal/familiar.

== Social context ==
Mammaplasty started as a surgical procedure to help relieve women of the excess weight of their breasts; it was only later that it was used for cosmetic purposes. There is social pressure on women to subscribe to socially prescribed beauty standards of how their bodies must be, and one part of this is the pressure on women to have 'perfect breasts'. Earlier records of such surgery were either for medical purposes or to make a person fit in more easily with a certain social group. It was in the beginning of the 20th century that Hippolyte Morestin and Eugene Hollander started breast reduction (reduction mammoplasty) for beauty purposes only. By the 1930s though, breast reduction had become more of aesthetic surgery than reconstructive surgery.

It is still however used for medical purposes and female celebrities vocally getting such surgery has allowed for more to undertake it and speak up openly about it, a recent example of it being Ariel Winter, who plays Alex in Modern Family, undergoing breast reduction surgery after years of back and neck pain.

== Augmentation mammaplasty ==
Breast augmentation, sometimes referred to as a "boob job" by patients, involves using breast implants or fat transfer to increase the size of one's breasts. This procedure can also restore breast volume lost after weight reduction or pregnancy, achieve a more rounded breast shape or improve natural breast size asymmetry. For some women, breast augmentation is a way to feel more confident. For others, it is part of rebuilding the breast for various conditions.

Breast augmentation is performed with implants (see below) that can be placed under a chest muscle or over a chest muscle. In general, all breast augmentations are minimally invasive procedures, involving incisions that are usually between 3 and 5 cm in length. Breast augmentation is a relatively straightforward procedure. As with any surgery, some uncertainty and risk are associated with breast augmentation surgery.

=== What breast augmentation surgery can do ===
- Increase fullness and projection of the breasts
- Improve balance of breast and hip contours
- Enhance self-image

=== Risks ===
Breast augmentation poses various risks, including:

- Scar tissue that distorts the shape of the breast implant (capsular contracture)
- Breast pain
- Infection
- Changes in nipple and breast sensation
- Implant leakage or rupture

== Reduction mammaplasty ==
Breast reduction surgery is also known as reduction mammaplasty or mammoplasty. It is a cosmetic surgical procedure aimed at reducing large or sagging breasts to a more comfortable size and shape. Large ptotic (sagging) breasts can become troublesome for patients, leading to potentially debilitating symptoms and a poor quality of life. Patients seeking breast reduction commonly present with complaints of migraines, back pain, neck pain, severe discomfort, unwanted harassment, poor self-image and anxiety among other symptoms. These patients can benefit greatly from a reduction in breast size, as most symptoms are relieved by reduction mammaplasty.

=== Reasons for treatment ===
Many women with large breasts experience varying degrees of physical and psychological distress, often including:

- Pain in the breasts, neck, back or shoulders;
- Bad posture;
- Inability to participate in sports;
- Low self-esteem; and
- Increased self-consciousness.

The goal of the surgery is to reduce the breast size so that they are more comfortable and proportional to the woman's physique.

=== Benefits ===
Thousands of mammaplasties are performed every year, and most women are happy with the results. A study of 66 women who had undergone breast reduction reported that the women showed a 94% satisfaction with the results of the procedure (in terms of size, shape, nipple position, and sensation in the breast). This study also reported great improvement in self-esteem, and problems with appearance, exercise and embarrassment over breast size were substantially reduced.

Overall, this and other studies have shown that breast reduction improves function, wellbeing and quality of life for women with excessively large or sagging breasts.

=== Risks ===
Specific risks of breast reduction surgery include:

- Infection;
- Wound breakdown;
- Bleeding;
- Asymmetry of breasts (size and shape);
- Abnormal scarring;
- Loss of sensation in the nipple or breast skin;
- Breastfeeding problems; and
- Need for repeat surgery.

== Breast cancer and reconstructive mammaplasty ==
Research has indicated that breast reduction surgery, for women who are at high risk for breast cancer, may serve as an effective primary prevention strategy for tackling breast cancer and is not shown to increase chances of the breast cancer coming back or making it harder to check this through a mammography. As opposed to mastectomy, therapeutic mammoplasty has emerged as a way to address breast cancer in women with larger breasts and where early breast cancer is detected, this helps align with the cosmetic needs of the person in question and has positive health benefits as well.

Many reports have also addressed the relationship between breast cancer and augmentation mammaplasty using implants. Most of them report that there is no increased rate of breast cancer in patients with augmentation mammaplasty. On the contrary, several studies have reported that the rate of breast cancer is actually lower in patients with augmentation mammaplasty. These studies argue that the lower incidence rate of breast cancer is probably due to the lower calorie intake of patients who wish to have augmentation mammaplasty. These patients, being on the thinner side, do not have a tendency toward breast cancer.

A concern for breast cancer survivors can be the physical appearance of their breasts after the surgical procedures required to cure breast cancer in several cases. Reconstructive mammaplasty is breast reconstruction that is done after mastectomy to give the breasts an appearance that is more normal/familiar. Some factors that are considered before deciding whether such surgery would be apt are the size and shape of the breasts before operation, the amount of tissue remaining after the mastectomy, chance of the cancer returning, and what the mastectomy scar looks like and where it is. Mammoplasty has also evolved as a way for women to address physical changes that mastectomy brings about to their bodies. Surgery to reconstruct the breasts can be started along with the mastectomy or after the body has healed from the mastectomy.

Mammograms in general are not performed on reconstructed breasts that have had implants, it is recommended that a woman who has had a breast implant let the radiology technician know of it, before a mammogram, as special steps may be necessary for ensuring correct results and not causing harm to the implant.
