= Seroma =

Pocket of fluid that sometimes develops after surgery

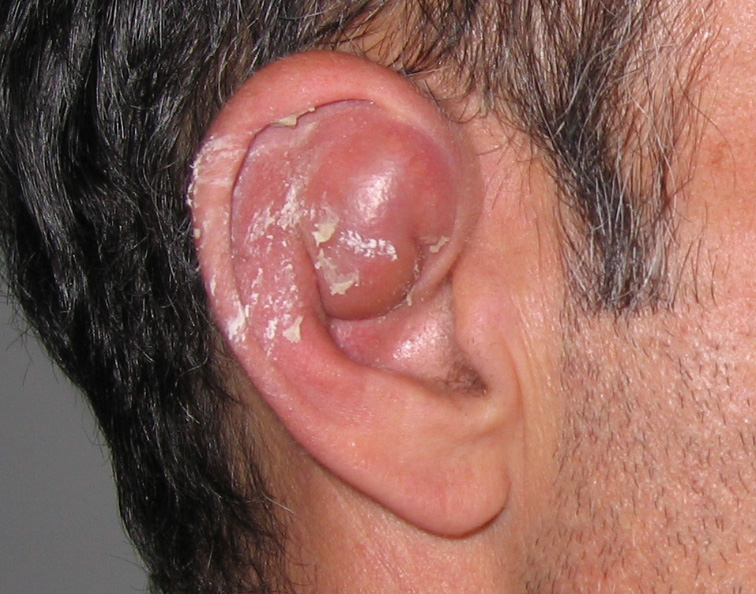
- A seroma on a man's right ear
- Specialty: Surgery
- Causes: Surgery (particularly breast surgery, abdominal surgery, reconstructive surgery)
- Diagnostic method: Physical signs, CT scan
- Treatment: Surgical drain

A seroma is a pocket of clear serous fluid (filtered blood plasma). They may sometimes develop in the body after surgery, particularly after breast surgery, abdominal surgery, and reconstructive surgery. They can be diagnosed by physical signs, and with a CT scan.

Seromas can be difficult to manage. Serous fluid may leak out naturally, and a persistent leak can cause problems. Fluid can be drained, including by inserting a drain surgically. Seromas can be prevented through careful surgery, and drains can be inserted before they form. Patient posturing and position can reduce risk, as well as breast binding after breast surgery.

== Etymology ==
Around 16th century CE, the word originated from French: séreux, meaning "watery" later the meaning changed to "of, secreting, or containing serum". It is directly derived from Latin: serosus, meaning "watery fluid, whey".

It was joined with a word-forming element from Greek: oma, with -o-, lengthened stem vowel + -ma suffix, especially taken in medical use as "tumor" or "morbid growth".

== Classification ==
A seroma contains serous fluid. This is composed of blood plasma that has seeped out of ruptured small blood vessels and the inflammatory fluid produced by injured and dying cells. Seromas are different from hematomas, which contain red blood cells, and abscesses, which contain pus and result from an infection. Serous fluid is also different from lymph.

== Signs and symptoms ==
A seroma can usually be felt as a hard mass under the skin. This may cause erythema (skin redness). They can also cause significant pain.

== Cause ==
A seroma is usually caused by surgery. Seromas are particularly common after breast surgery (e.g., mastectomy), abdominal surgery, and reconstructive surgery. It can also be seen after neck surgery, thyroid and parathyroid surgery, and hernia repair. The larger the surgical intervention, the more likely that seromas form. Early or improper removal of sutures can sometimes lead to formation of seroma or discharge of serous fluid from operative areas. Seromas can also sometimes be caused by injury, such as when the initial swelling from a blow or fall does not fully subside. The remaining serous fluid causes a seroma that the body usually absorbs gradually over time (often taking many days or weeks), but a knot of calcified tissue sometimes remains. Large seromas take longer to resolve than small ones, and they are more likely to undergo secondary infection. A seroma may persist for several months, or even years as the surrounding tissue hardens.

Seroma is the most common surgical complication after breast surgery. It is due to the presence of rich lymphatic system in the breast, low fibrinogen levels in lymph fluid and potential space creation in the breast after surgery, which contributes to seroma formation. Seroma is more common in older and obese people.

== Diagnosis ==
A seroma may be diagnosed based on signs on the skin. On CT scans, seromas have a radiodensity of 0–20 Hounsfield units, generally in the lower part of this range, consistent with clear fluid.

== Prevention ==
=== Surgical ===
Gentle surgical technique with careful and meticulous control of bleeding helps avoid seromas. Liposuction contributes to seroma formation when it is done in conjunction with creating a "flap" and potential space is confluent with the treated area. Controversy exists in tummy tuck surgery as to whether electrosurgical dissection either contributes to serum formation or prevents it.

Drains are traditionally used, but their use has been challenged by various authors who believe quilting sutures alone may be sufficient to reach results as good as or better than when using drains. Seromas accumulate in what is known as "dead space" where a potential place for the fluid exists. Efforts are directed at reducing or eliminating the dead space. Quilting sutures reduce the risk of the skin–fat layer's separating from the deeper muscle layer, and having the separation fill up with fluid, by physically holding those layers together. Drains suck the two layers together so the body's natural "glue" (fibrin) and wound healing have a chance for a permanent bond.

=== Nonsurgical ===
Prevention of movement between the layers allows the tentative initial bond of fibrin to be reinforced by wound healing with a thin, strong, layer of scar. Avoiding certain positions for certain surgeries may have an effect. (In abdominoplasty, sitting upright with the knees bent and hips flexed will cause pressure across the lower abdomen and a tendency to seroma formation. The patient is best to stand or at least be semirecumbent). External pressure may help in immobilization, but also is thought to reduce the tendency of the fluid to leak out of vessels by increasing the backpressure on those fluid sources. Following breast augmentation or double mastectomy, binding the chest may be recommended for several weeks to minimize the risk of seromas.

== Treatment ==
Seromas may be difficult to manage at times. Quilting (inserting interrupted deep stitches in the wound) after mastectomy probably significantly reduces seroma formation. Fine-needle aspiration is a common procedure. However, it is controversial: it is recommended by some for the reason that a seroma can be a culture medium for bacteria, whereas others advise it only for collection of excessive amounts of fluid, because even an aspiration carried out under aseptic conditions carries a certain risk of infection. Depending on its volume and duration, control of a leak may take up to a few weeks to resolve with aspiration of serua and the application of pressure dressings. Manual lymphatic drainage conducted by a trained professional can also assist in managing and treating seromas.

If a serum or leak does not resolve (e.g., after a soft tissue biopsy), taking the patient back to the operating room may be necessary to place some form of closed-suction drain into the wound.

In case of lumpectomy, the formation of a seroma at the lumpectomy site has been cited in medical literature as being beneficial, with claims that it can contribute to preserve the contour of the breast.

Seromas are a treatment target in partial breast-radiation therapy. In some cases, a seroma may need to be drained prior to a course of radiotherapy adjuvant to surgery.

== See also ==
- Lymphocele
- Sialocele
