= Breast surgery =

- Specialty: Plastic surgery or oncological

Breast surgery is a form of surgery performed on the breast.

== Types ==
Types include:

- Breast augmentation
- Breast reduction
- Breast-conserving surgery, a less radical cancer surgery than mastectomy
- Lumpectomy
- Mastectomy
- Mastopexy, or breast lift surgery
- Microdochectomy (removal of a lactiferous duct)
- Surgery for breast abscess, including incision and drainage as well as excision of lactiferous ducts
- Surgical breast biopsy

== Complications ==
After surgical intervention to the breast, complications may arise related to wound healing. As in other types of surgery, hematoma (post-operative bleeding), seroma (fluid accumulation), or incision-site breakdown (wound infection) may occur.

Breast hematoma due to an operation will normally resolve with time but should be followed up with more detailed evaluation if it does not. Breast abscess can occur as post-surgical complication, for example after cancer treatment or reduction mammaplasty. Furthermore, if a breast has already undergone irradiation (as in radiation therapy for treating breast cancer), there is a heightened risk of complications (e.g. reactive inflammation, occurrence of a chronic draining wound, etc.) for breast biopsies or other interventions to the breast, even those often considered "minor" surgeries. The combined effects of radiation and breast cancer surgery can in particular lead to complications such as breast fibrosis, secondary lymphoedema (which may occur in the arm, the breast or the chest, in particular after axillary lymph node dissection), breast asymmetry, and chronic/recurrent breast cellulitis, each of these having long-term effects.

Ultrasound can be used to distinguish between seroma, hematoma, and edema in the breast. Further possible complications are fat necrosis (premature cell death of fat cells) and scar retraction (shrinking of the area around the surgical scar). In rare cases after breast reconstruction or augmentation, late seroma may occur, defined as seroma occurring more than 12 months postoperatively.

There is preliminary evidence suggesting that negative-pressure wound therapy may be useful in healing complicated breast wounds resulting from surgery.

Postoperative pain is common following breast surgery. The incidence of poorly controlled acute postoperative pain following breast cancer surgery ranges between 14.0% to 54.1%. Regional anaesthesia is superior compared to general anaesthesia for the prevention of persistent postoperative pain three to 12 months after breast cancer surgery.

In post-surgical medical imaging, many findings can easily be mistaken for cancer. In MRI, scars that occurred many years before are normally "silent".
