= Breast mass =

Localized swellings that feel different from the surrounding tissue

- Other names: Breast lump, breast tumor
- A breast lump associated with an inverted nipple and skin dimpling. Underlying cause was breast cancer.
- Specialty: Gynecology, General Surgery
- Symptoms: An area of the breast that feels different from the surrounding tissue
- Causes: Fibrocystic change, fibroadenomas, breast infection, galactoceles, breast cancer
- Diagnostic method: Examination, medical imaging, tissue biopsy
- Treatment: Depends on the underlying cause
- Frequency: Common

A breast mass, also known as a breast lump, is a localized swelling that feels different from the surrounding tissue. Breast pain, nipple discharge, or skin changes may be present. Concerning findings include masses that are hard, do not move easily, are of an irregular shape, or are firmly attached to surrounding tissue.

Causes include fibrocystic change, fibroadenomas, breast infection, galactoceles, and breast cancer. Breast cancer makes up about 10% of breast masses. Diagnosis is typically by examination, medical imaging, and tissue biopsy. Tissue biopsy is often by fine needle aspiration biopsy. Repeated examination may be required.

Treatment depends on the underlying cause. It may vary from simple pain medication to surgical removal. Some causes may resolve without treatment. Breast masses are relatively common. It is the most common breast complaint with the women's concern generally being that of cancer.

== Types ==
Women seeking evaluation of a breast lump
| Finding | Percentage |
|---|---|
| Fibrocystic breast changes | 40% |
| No disease | 30% |
| Fibroadenoma | 7% |
| Other benign mammary dysplasias and neoplasms | 13% |
| Breast cancer | 10% |

=== Cysts and abscesses ===
A breast cyst is a non-cancerous, fluid-filled sac in the breast. They generally feel smooth or rubbery under the skin and can be quite painful or cause no pain at all. Cysts are caused by the hormones that control the menstrual cycle and are rare in women older than 50.

A sebaceous cyst is a non-cancerous, closed sac or cyst below the skin that is caused by plugged ducts at the site of a hair follicle. Hormone stimulation or injury may cause them to enlarge but if no symptoms are present, medical treatment is not required.

Breast abscesses are non-cancerous pockets of infection within the breast. They can be quite painful and cause the skin over the breast to turn red or feel hot or solid. Abscesses of the breast are most common in women who are breast-feeding.

=== Growths ===
Adenomas are non-cancerous abnormal growths of the glandular tissue in the breast. The most common form of these growths, fibroadenomas, occur most frequently in women between the ages of 15 and 30 and in women of African descent. They usually feel round and firm and have smooth borders. Adenomas are not related to breast cancer.

Intraductal papillomas are wart-like growths in the ducts of the breast. These lumps are usually felt just under the nipple and can cause a bloody discharge from the nipple. Women close to menopause may have only one growth, while younger women are more likely to have multiple growths in one or both breasts.

Breast cancer usually feels like a hard or firm lump that is generally irregular in shape and may feel like it is attached to skin or tissue deep inside the breast. Breast cancer is rarely painful and can occur anywhere in the breast or nipple.

=== Fatty lumps ===
Fat necrosis is a condition in which the normal fat cells of the breast become round lumps. Symptoms can include pain, firmness, redness, and/or bruising. Fat necrosis usually goes away without treatment but can form permanent scar tissue that may show up as an abnormality on a mammogram.

A lipoma is a non-cancerous lump of fatty tissue that is soft to the touch, usually movable, and is generally painless.

=== Other ===
Breast hematomas and seromas may be visible as a local swelling of the breast. Seromas are a common complication of breast surgery. Hematomas can also occur after breast surgery or breast injury or, more rarely, they can occur spontaneously in patients with coagulopathy.

== Diagnosis ==
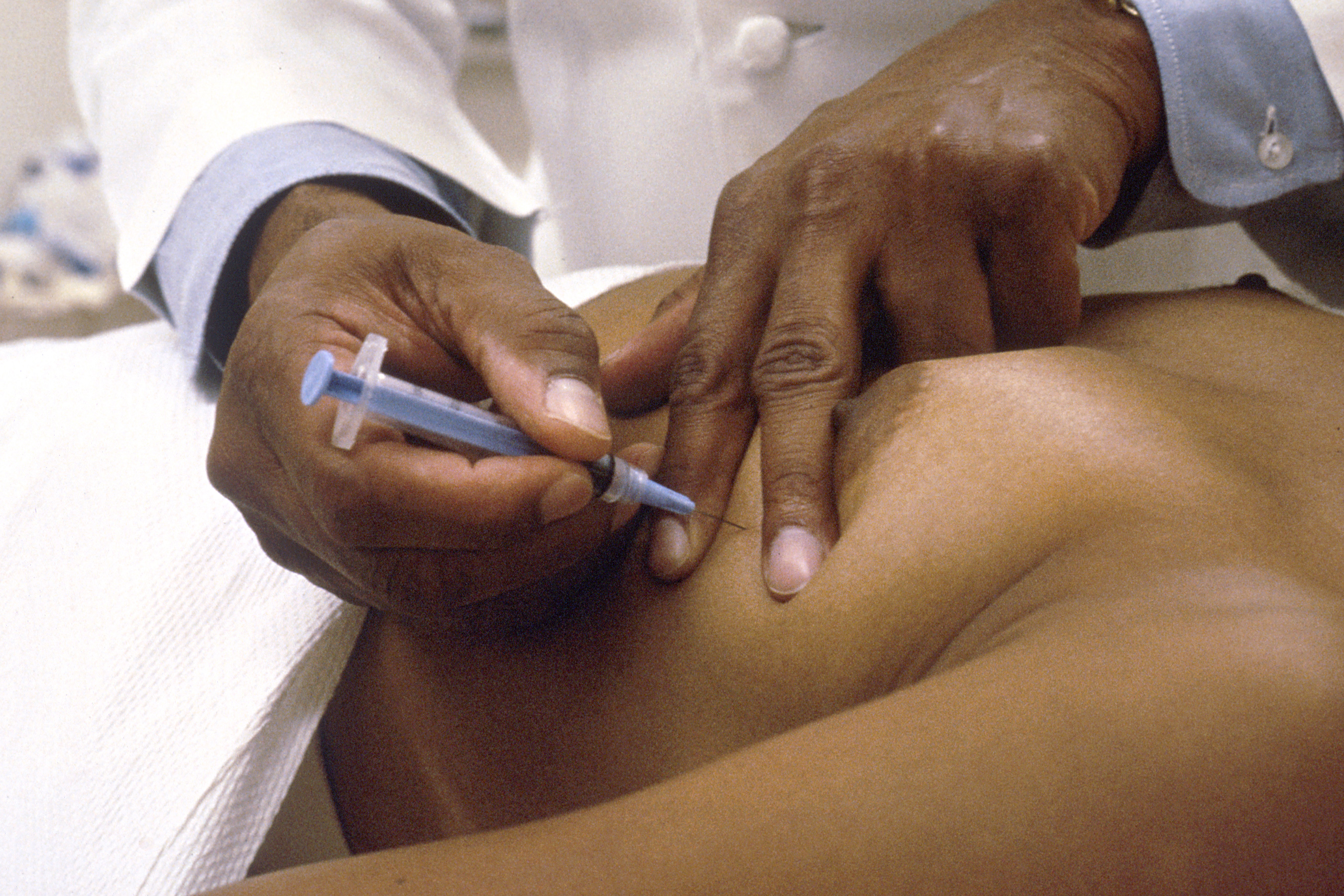
A fine needle biopsy

Breast lumps are often discovered during a breast self-examination or during a routine check-up. Upon noticing an unusual lump in the breast the best course of action is to schedule an examination with a physician who can best diagnose the type of breast lump and strategy for treatment.

== Treatment ==
Treatments for breast lumps vary depending on the type of lump. Standard breast cysts and abscesses require drainage for treatment, while sebaceous cysts and fatty lumps are best treated by surgical removal.

=== Fibroadenoma treatment ===
Several treatment options currently exist for fibroadenomas: "wait and watch," open surgery and minimally-invasive surgical alternatives.

- "Waiting and watching" is common for very small fibroadenomas and involves routine check-ups with a physician every 6–12 months.
- Open surgery has historically been the most common method for removing large fibroadenomas, but has several disadvantages. Surgery often requires general anesthesia and a day in the hospital, and can leave significant scarring at the site of the incision.
- Minimally-invasive surgical alternatives include biopsy-removal techniques and cryoablation. Biopsy-removal involves using a vacuum-assisted biopsy device to remove the fibroadenoma bit by bit. This procedure can be effective but often does not remove all of the fibroadenoma, resulting in a possible re-growth. In cryoablation, an ultrasound-guided probe is inserted into the fibroadenoma through a small incision in the breast. Extremely cold temperatures are then used to freeze the lesion, which eventually dies and is reabsorbed into the body.

== See also ==
- Cancer Diagnosis Probe
