= Breast cyst =

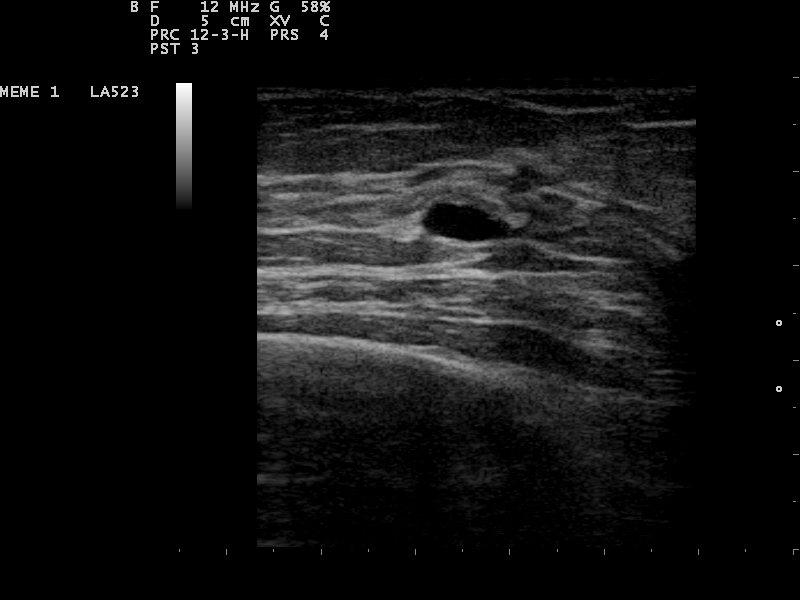
- Ultrasound scan showing a small cyst in the breast
- Specialty: General surgery

A breast cyst is a cyst, a fluid-filled sac, within the breast. One breast can have one or more cysts. They are often described as round or oval lumps with distinct edges. In texture, a breast cyst usually feels like a soft grape or a water-filled balloon, but sometimes a breast cyst feels firm.

Breast cysts can be painful and may be worrisome but are generally benign. They are most common in pre-menopausal women in their 30s or 40s. They usually disappear after menopause, but may persist or reappear when using hormone therapy. They are also common in adolescents. Breast cysts can be part of fibrocystic disease. The pain and swelling is usually worse in the second half of the menstrual cycle or during pregnancy.

Treating breast cysts is usually not necessary unless they are painful or cause discomfort. In most cases, the discomfort they cause may be alleviated by draining the fluid from the cyst. The cysts form as a result of the growth of the milk glands. While some large cysts feel like lumps, most cysts cannot be identified during physical examinations.

Breast cysts are not to be confused with "milk cysts" (galactoceles), which usually appear during weaning.

== Signs and symptoms ==
Signs and symptoms of breast cysts include:

- A smooth, easily movable round or oval breast lump with distinct edges
- Breast pain or tenderness in the area of the lump
- Increased lump size and tenderness just before menstruation
- Decreased lump size and resolution of other signs and symptoms after menstruation

Having one or many simple breast cysts does not increase a person's risk of breast cancer.

Lumps in the breast are often not found during self-examinations or physical exams. However, in some cases they can be felt at touch, especially if they are larger.

Breasts are usually lumpy or nodular as a result of the hormonal changes that women go through during their menstrual cycle. However, new breast lumps should always be referred to a specialist.

Cysts can also be confused with infections that form on the nipple or the areola. A common cyst look-alike is a localised infection of a duct in the nipple. It may appear as a bump, and may look yellow or white due to being pus-filled. These can happen regardless of if the individual is breastfeeding, though if breastfeeding it could also be a bleb. For individuals, checking with a doctor about symptoms may provide more clarity.^{(source?)}

Fluid leaking from a cyst, as may happen due to puncture or vigorous compression during mammography, or due to seat belt injury in the course of an automobile accident, may trigger an aseptic inflammation in the surrounding breast tissue.

== Diagnosis ==
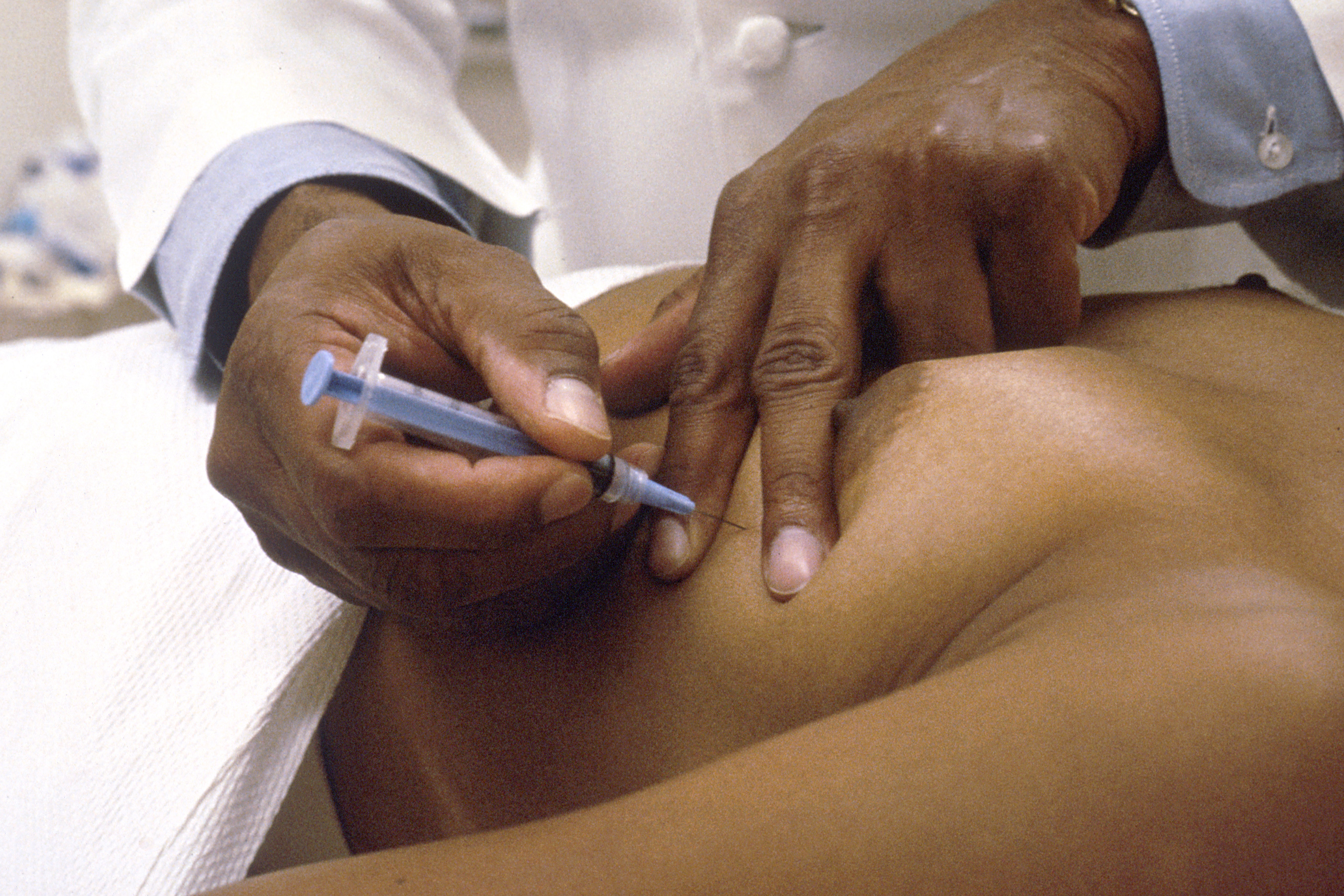
Needle biopsy being performed to determine nature of lump either fluid-filled cyst or solid tumor

The cystic nature of a breast lump can be confirmed by ultrasound examination, aspiration (removal of contents with needle), or mammogram. Ultrasound can also show if the cyst contains solid nodules, a sign that the lesion may be pre-cancerous or cancerous. Examination by a cytopathologist of the fluid aspirated from the cyst may also help with this diagnosis. In particular, it should be sent to a laboratory for testing if it is blood-stained.

Commonly, cysts are detected with the help of mammograms. However, the medical history and physical examination also play an important role in establishing an accurate diagnosis. During these tests, the doctor will try to find out as much information as possible regarding the symptoms the patient has experienced, their intensity and duration and the physical examination is performed regularly to check for other abnormalities that may exist within the breast.

Because cysts are typically undetectable by touch, a mammogram provides valuable, clear images of the breast tissue. Generally, if there is any abnormality within the breast tissue, it will be shown on the mammogram. There are two types of mammograms. One is primarily used in screening, and is ordered for patients who do not show any symptoms. These are called screening mammograms. Diagnostic mammograms are used on patients who develop symptoms of a breast condition or in patients whose screening mammograms showed abnormalities.

Patients suspected of breast cysts will normally be given a diagnosing mammogram, although they are not suspected of cancer. This type of mammogram provides the doctor with the option of performing a breast ultrasound at the same time, which is why they are often preferred over screening mammograms. Breast ultrasound is considered the best option when diagnosing breast cysts because it is 95 to 100% accurate, it provides a clear image of the cyst's appearance (simple or complex) and it may also distinguish between solid lumps and fluid-filled cysts, which a mammogram cannot do. Breast ultrasounds are performed using a handheld medical instrument which is placed on the skin, after a special type of fluid has been applied. The instruments picks up the echo resulted from the sound waves it sends into the breast. These echoes are transmitted to a computer which translates it into a picture.

Breast cysts may remain stable for many years or may resolve spontaneously. Most simple cysts are benign and do not require any treatment or further diagnosis. Some complex cysts may require further diagnostic measures such as fine needle aspiration or biopsy to exclude breast cancer, however the overwhelming majority are benign. Aspiration both diagnoses and removes cysts at the same time. That is, cysts will usually resolve on their own after the fluid is drained. Otherwise, if the lump is not a cyst, the fluid aspirated may contain blood or there may not be fluid at all. Whereas in the first case, the fluid is sent to the laboratory for further examination, the latter circumstance is a sign that the breast lump is solid. This type of tumor needs to be biopsied in order to determine whether it is malignant or benign.

== Prevention ==
The development of breast cysts may be prevented to some degree, according to the majority of the specialists. The recommended measures one is able to take in order to avoid the formation of the cysts include practicing good health and avoiding certain medications, eating a balanced diet, taking necessary vitamins and supplements, getting exercise, and avoiding stress.

Although caffeine consumption does not have a scientifically proved connection with the process of cyst development, many women claim that their symptoms are relieved if avoiding it. Some doctors recommend reducing the amount of caffeine in one's diet in terms of both beverages and foods (such as chocolate). Also reducing salt intake may help in alleviating the symptoms of breast cysts, although, again, there is no scientific linkage between these two. Excessive sugar consumption as well as undetected food allergies, such as to gluten or lactose, may also contribute to cyst development.

== Treatment ==
Breast cysts do not require treatment unless a cyst is large and painful or otherwise uncomfortable. In that case, draining the fluid from a breast cyst can ease symptoms.

Nipple cysts (commonly duct infections) may benefit from a hot compress to draw out the pus and antibacterial cream. These infected ducts typically clear up within a few days.

Typical treatment involves a needle aspiration biopsy which is typically done with a 10 cc syringe attached to a fine needle aspiration needle. Fine needle aspiration allows retrieval of cytological samples that can be sent for pathological review to determine if the cyst is benign or malignant. Aspirated cysts often recur (come back); definitive treatment may require surgery. During an excisional biopsy an incision is made around the mass creating a superior and inferior flap. The mass is dissected out followed by confirmation of hemostasis. Once hemostasis is confirmed the wound is closed with an absorbable suture. The mass is then sent to pathology for review. Pathology can help determine if the surgeon needs to dissect a bigger margin.

Draining the fluid and then waiting for the cyst to resolve is the main treatment applied in these cases. Moreover, if cysts are aspirated and the fluid looks normal, they do not require any other medical attention apart from following-up to make sure they have completely disappeared. Hormone therapy, by the means of oral contraceptives, is sometimes prescribed to reduce their recurrence and to regulate the menstrual cycle of the patient (which is likely to cause them in the first place). Danazol may also be prescribed to treat this condition and it is usually considered in patients on whom the non-medical treatment fails and the symptoms are intense.

Surgical removal of a breast cyst is necessary only in a few unusual circumstances. If an uncomfortable breast cyst recurs month after month, or if a breast cyst contains blood-tinged fluid and displays other worrisome signs, surgery may be considered.

== Epidemiology ==
It is estimated that 7% of women in the western world develop palpable breast cysts.

In males, the occurrence of breast cysts is rare and may (but need not) be an indication of malignancy.

== Cysts and bra support ==
Some women ^{(why is this cysts related? Do they mean, some of the women who have breast cysts?)} experience breast pain, especially when engaging in vigorous physical activity. A properly fitted sports bra, which compresses or encapsulates breast tissue, is designed to reduce pain caused by exercise.
