= Breast disease =

- Other names: Breast problems
- Specialty: Gynecology

Breast diseases make up a number of conditions. The most common symptoms are a breast mass, breast pain, and nipple discharge.

A majority of breast diseases are noncancerous. Although breast disease may be benign, or non-life threatening there remains an associated risk with potentially a higher risk of developing breast cancer later on.

== Tumor ==
Early warning signs of breast cancer

A breast tumor is an abnormal mass of tissue in the breast as a result of neoplasia. A breast neoplasm may be benign, as in fibroadenoma, or it may be malignant, in which case it is termed breast cancer. Either case commonly presents as a breast lump. Approximately 7% of breast lumps are fibroadenomas and 10% are breast cancer, the rest being other benign conditions or no disease.

Phyllodes tumor is a fibroepithelial tumor which can be benign, borderline or malignant.

=== Breast cancer ===
Breast cancer is cancer of the breast tissues, most commonly arising from the milk ducts. Worldwide, breast cancer is the leading type of cancer in women, accounting for 25% of all cases. It is most common in women over age 50.

Signs of breast cancer may include a lump in the breast, a change in breast shape, dimpling of the skin, fluid coming from the nipple, a newly inverted nipple, or a red or scaly patch of skin. Diagnosis may also be made when the cancer is asymptomatic, through breast cancer screening programs, such as mammograms. Outcomes for breast cancer vary depending on the cancer type, extent of disease, and person's age. Survival rates in the developed world are high, with between 80% and 90% of those in England and the United States alive for at least 5 years.

== Fibrocystic breast changes ==
Also called: fibrocystic breast disease, chronic cystic mastitis, diffuse cystic mastopathy, mammary dysplasia

== Infections and inflammations ==
These may be caused among others by trauma, secretory stasis/milk engorgement, hormonal stimulation, infections or autoimmune reactions. Repeated occurrence unrelated to lactation requires endocrinological examination.

- bacterial mastitis
- mastitis from milk engorgement or secretory stasis
- mastitis
- chronic subareolar abscess
- tuberculosis of the breast
- syphilis of the breast
- retromammary abscess
- actinomycosis of the breast
- duct ectasia syndrome
- breast engorgement

== Other breast conditions ==
- Mondor's disease
- Paget's disease of the breast
- nipple discharge, galactorrhea
- breast cyst
- mastalgia
- galactocoele

== Psychological distress ==
Breast diseases can cause much psychological distress due to the fear of malignancy and its overlap with breast cancer.

Psychological distress can come in the form of anxiety. Additionally, distress levels can be associated with variables such as education and counseling quality, perceived social support, medical and family history of breast cancer, and personality traits, especially trait anxiety and optimism.

Uncertainty also contributes to psychological distress and may result in behavioral changes, such as reduced additional screening compliance or increased mammography usage due to fear of breast cancer diagnosis.

Active coping strategies and social support can be beneficial in reducing distress. Shorter diagnostic intervals can improve satisfaction but may not necessarily lower distress. Faster confirmation of malignancy may increase anxiety due to decreased adjustment time.

=== Adolescence ===
Benign breast disorders can occur in adolescence and impact psychology, self-esteem, socialization, and overall quality of life, as adolescence is typically the start of breast development. Specifically, juvenile breast hypertrophy and breast masses can result in stress, limitations in daily routine, and psychosexual problems.

=== Male breast disease ===
While not common in clinical practice, men can be diagnosed with benign breast disorders. Men typically express concern only when their breasts become tender or enlarged, which often leads to feelings of embarrassment. Psychological distress is present in both men and women with breast disease, even when the diagnosis is benign. For both men and women, having multiple medical issues, the presence of trait anxiety, and a higher level of education increase the likelihood of having distress due to breast disease. Additionally, women receive more emotional support than men. While women tend to seek support, men are more likely to use concealment and suppression as a way to cope. Furthermore, body image, masculine identity, and strength are some concerns for men when diagnosed with breast disease.

== See also ==
- Mammary gland
