= Ormylia Center =

Medical center in Chalkidike, Greece

Coordinates: 40.2624°N 23.5583°E

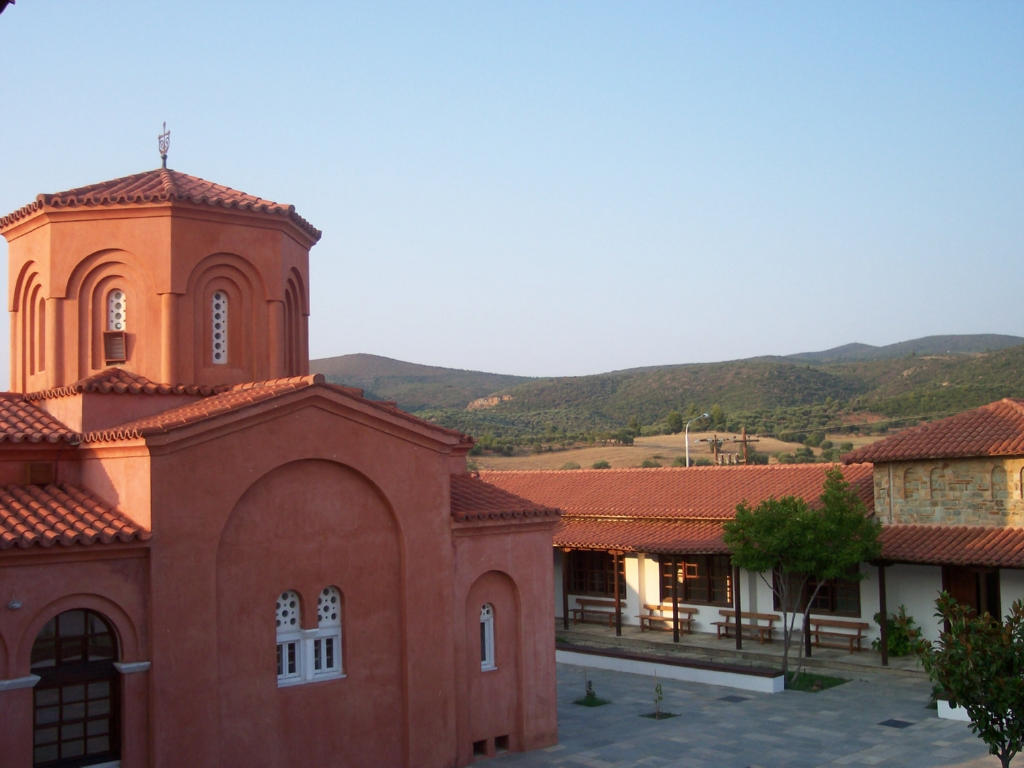
The Ormylia Foundation

The Ormylia Center/Foundation is located in Chalkidike, Northern Greece and its Panagia Philanthropini Center aims to make a profound difference in the lives of many underprivileged women and children living in remote communities in the area. The foundation aims to contribute towards the well being of mankind through charitable actions. The two centers of the foundation are the Panagia Philanthropini and the Art Diagnosis Center.

== Goals of the Center ==
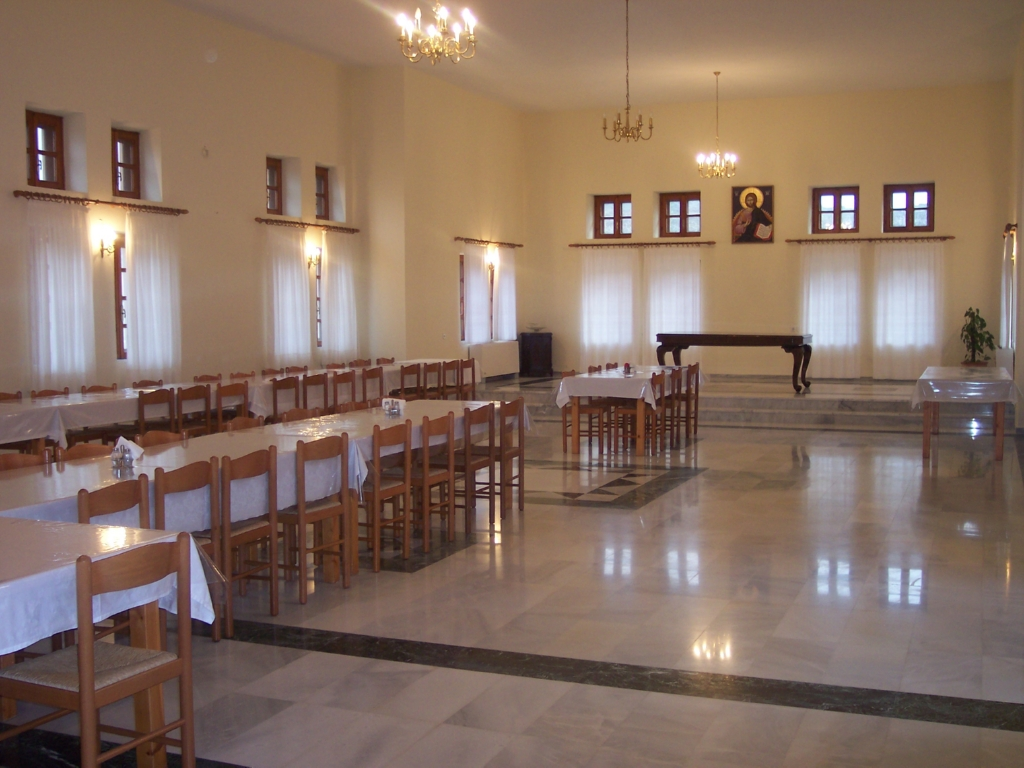
A room in the center where patients may rest.

The Foundation aims to provide preventative medical care, to promote medical research, and to develop programs that offer emotional and material support to the local population, with emphasis on underprivileged populations.

== The Center for social advancement, medical prevention and research ==
The Center is member of the Global Breast Health Initiative and the EU's Breast and Cervical Cancer Networks, and has been appointed by the US National Cancer Institute and the National Institutes of Health as a member of the International Cancer Screening Network. The Foundation offers free pap smears, clinical breast examinations, pelvic examinations, and mammography. Additionally, the center teaches breast self-examinations. It aims to give 7,000 screenings to underprivileged women per year for the next five years.

== Focus on breast cancer screening ==
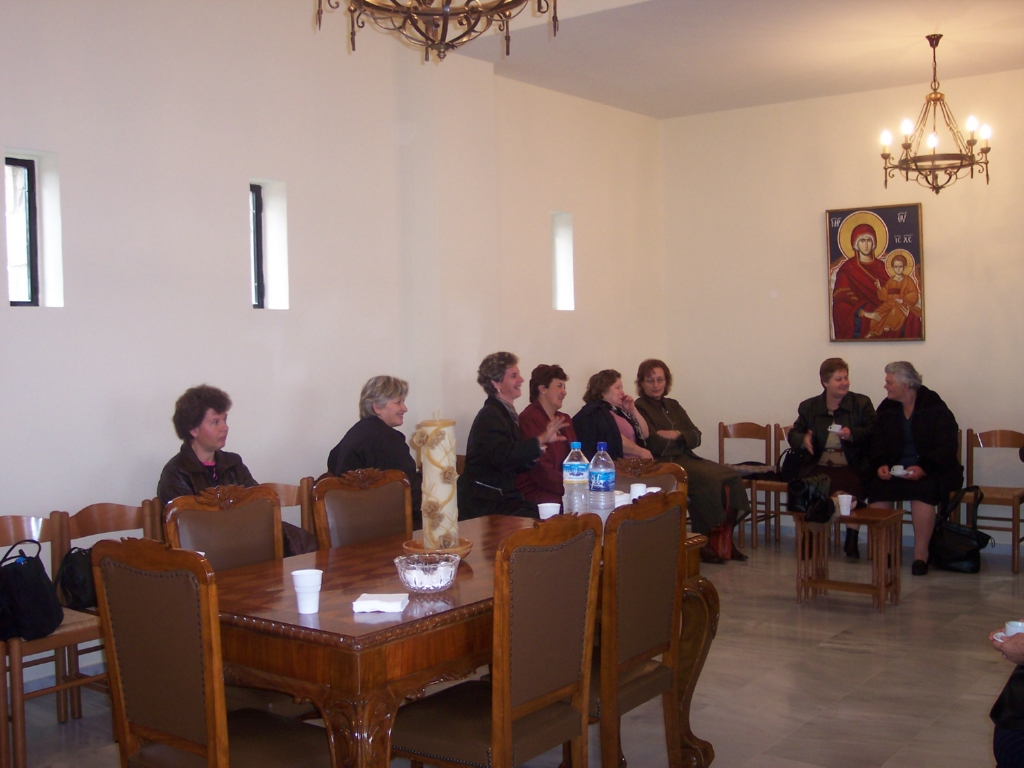
Breast and Cervical Cancer Screening Patients

The Center provides breast and cervical cancer diagnostic screening free of charge at the fully equipped facilities established by the Convent with support from Hellenic and international medical experts. After the LIVESTRONG's Global Cancer Summit call in 2009 for Commitments in the fight against cancer, the Ormylia Foundation formally committed to increasing their outreach to acutely underprivileged groups, many of which are primarily Muslim religious groups including Pomaks, Romani and other Turkish speaking communities. The Ormylia Foundation focuses on a holistic view of the women, advocating for not only their health but also their quality of life.

== Focus on helping victims of trafficking and acutely underprivileged children ==
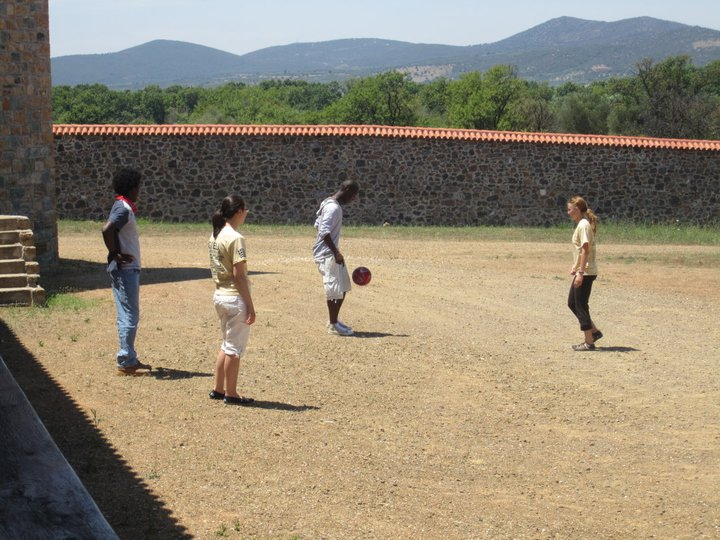
Social Support for Underprivileged Children and Victims of Trafficking

This is a new initiative of the center to provide support for acutely underprivileged children in Northern Greece. These children are very often victims of trafficking, abuse, and homelessness. The center provides health screening and emotional support and is currently looking into education support for these children.

== International higher education activities ==
One of the goals of the Center, since 2001, has been to recruit young upcoming professionals from various higher education institutes in the United States and in the European Union. This initiative has resulted in a small group of students participating in the work of the center every summer from universities such as Brown University, Southern Methodist University of Dallas, TX, the University of Michigan-Ann Arbor, and the University of Massachusetts Amherst. In the summer of 2011, students from the University of Michigan and also a student from the University of Massachusetts Amherst assisted the Center through web development, grant proposals, and emotional support for homeless and trafficked children. The students come from a variety of backgrounds including medicine, anthropology, nursing, biology, political science, and engineering.
