= Open biopsy =

Procedure

An open biopsy is a procedure in which a surgical incision (cut) is made through the skin to expose and remove tissues. The biopsy tissue is examined under a microscope by a pathologist. An open biopsy may be done in the doctor's office or hospital, and may use local anesthesia or general anesthesia. A lumpectomy to remove a breast tumor is a type of open biopsy.
