= Breast pain =

- Other names: Mastodynia, mastalgia, breast tenderness
- Specialty: Gynecology, General surgery
- Types: Cyclic, non-cyclic
- Causes: Menstrual cycle related, birth control pills, hormone therapy, psychiatric medication, breast cancer
- Diagnostic method: Examination, medical imaging
- Differential diagnosis: Gallstones, thoracic outlet syndrome, costochondritis
- Treatment: Reassurance after ruling out cancer, medications
- Medication: Paracetamol, NSAIDs
- Prognosis: >75% resolve without treatment
- Frequency: 70% of women

Breast pain is the symptom of discomfort in either one or both breasts. Pain in both breasts is often described as breast tenderness, is usually associated with the menstrual period and is not serious. Pain that involves only one part of a breast is more concerning, particularly if a hard mass or nipple discharge is also present.

Causes may be related to the menstrual cycle, birth control pills, hormone therapy, or psychiatric medication. Pain may also occur in those with large breasts, during menopause, and in early pregnancy. In about 2% of cases, breast pain is related to breast cancer. Diagnosis involves examination, with medical imaging if only a specific part of the breast hurts.

In more than 75% of people, the pain resolves without any specific treatment. Otherwise treatments may include paracetamol or NSAIDs. A well fitting bra may also help. In those with severe pain tamoxifen or danazol may be used. About 70% of women have breast pain at some point in time. Breast pain is one of the most common breast symptoms, along with breast masses and nipple discharge.

== Causes ==
Breast pain linked to the menstrual cycle is called cyclic breast pain or cyclic mastalgia. Some degree of cyclical breast tenderness is normal in the menstrual cycle, and is usually associated with menstruation and/or premenstrual syndrome (PMS). Cyclic breast pain is often associated with fibrocystic breast changes or duct ectasia and thought to be caused by changes of prolactin response to thyrotropin.

Breast pain that is not linked to a menstrual cycle is called noncyclic breast pain. Noncyclical breast pain has various causes and is harder to diagnose, and frequently the root cause is outside the breast. Some degree of non-cyclical breast tenderness can normally be present due to hormonal changes in puberty (both in girls and boys), in menopause, and during pregnancy. After pregnancy, breast pain can be caused by breastfeeding. Other causes of non-cyclical breast pain include alcoholism with liver damage (likely due to abnormal steroid metabolism), mastitis and medications such as digitalis, methyldopa (an antihypertensive), spironolactone, certain diuretics, oxymetholone (an anabolic steroid), and chlorpromazine (a typical antipsychotic). Also, shingles can cause a painful blistering rash on the skin of the breasts.

=== Breast cancer ===
Some women who have pain in one or both breasts may fear breast cancer. However, breast pain is not a common symptom of cancer. The great majority of breast cancer cases do not present with symptoms of pain, though breast pain in older women is more likely to be associated with cancer.

== Diagnosis ==
Diagnosis involves breast examination, with medical imaging if only a specific part of the breast hurts. Medical imaging by ultrasound is recommended for all ages, as well in those over 35, it is recommended together with mammography.

Ruling out the other possible causes of the pain is one way to differentiate the source of the pain. Breast pain can be due to:

- angina pectoris
- bra
- blocked milk duct
- breastfeeding
- chest wall muscle pain
- costochondritis (sore ribs)
- cutaneous Candidiasis infection
- duct ectasia (often with nipple discharge)
- engorgement
- fibroadenoma
- fibrocystic breast changes
- fibromyalgia
- gastroesophageal reflux disease
- herpes infection
- hormone replacement therapy
- mastitis or breast infection
- menopause
- menstruation and Premenstrual syndrome
- perimenopause
- neuralgia
- pregnancy
- physical abuse
- pituitary tumor (often with nipple discharge)
- puberty in both girls and boys
- sexual abuse
- shingles
- sore nipples and cracked nipples
- surgery or biopsy
- trauma (including falls)

Medications can be associated with breast pain and include:

- Oxymetholone
- Chlorpromazine
- Water pills (diuretics)
- Digitalis preparations
- Methyldopa
- Spironolactone

Diagnostic testing can be useful. Typical tests used are mammogram, excisional biopsy for solid lumps, fine-needle aspiration and biopsy, pregnancy test, ultrasonography, and magnetic resonance imaging (MRI).

== Treatment ==
In more than 75% of people, the pain resolves without any specific treatment. Otherwise treatments may include paracetamol or NSAIDs. A well fitting bra may also help. In those with severe pain tamoxifen or danazol may be used.

Bromocriptine may be used as well.

Spironolactone, low-dose oral contraceptives, and low-dose estrogen have helped to relieve pain. Topical anti-inflammatory medications can be used for localized pain. Vitamin E is not effective in relieving pain nor is evening primrose oil. Vitamin B_{6} and vitamin A have not been consistently found to be beneficial. Flaxseed has shown some activity in the treatment of cyclic mastalgia.

Pain may be relieved by the use of nonsteroidal anti-inflammatory drugs or, for more severe localized pain, by local anaesthetic. Pain may be relieved by reassurance that it does not signal a serious underlying problem, and an active lifestyle can also improve the pain.

Information regarding how the pain is real but not necessarily caused by disease can help to understand the problem. Counseling can also be used to describe changes that vary during the monthly cycle. Women on hormone replacement therapy may benefit from a dose adjustment. Another non-pharmacological measure to help relieve symptoms of pain may be to use a good bra support. Breasts change during adolescence and menopause, and refitting may be beneficial. Applying heat and/or ice can bring relief. Dietary changes may also help with the pain. Methylxanthines can be eliminated from the diet to see if a sensitivity is present. Some clinicians recommend a reduction in salt, though no evidence supports this practice.

== See also ==
- Galactagogue
- Mammoplasia
- Pain management
