= Breast self-examination =

Physical and visual inspection of one's own breasts

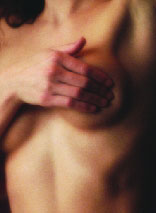
- A woman examines her breast.
- MeSH: D016504
- MedlinePlus: 001993

Breast self-examination (BSE) is a screening method used in an attempt to detect early breast cancer. The method involves the woman herself looking at and feeling each breast for possible lumps, distortions or swelling.

BSE was once promoted heavily as a means of finding cancer at a more curable stage, but large randomized controlled studies found that it was not effective in preventing death, and actually caused harm through needless biopsies, surgery, and anxiety. The World Health Organization and other organizations recommend against BSE. Other organizations take a neutral stance, and do not recommend for or against BSE.

Breast awareness is an informal alternative to breast self-examinations, where women acquaint themselves with their breasts in order to become more aware of any changes in their bodies without practicing regularly scheduled self-examinations and any patient-observed change or abnormality in the breast anatomy are reported to a healthcare team for further evaluation.

== Limitations ==
According to a meta-analysis in the Cochrane Collaboration, two large trials in Russia and Shanghai found no beneficial effects of screening by breast self-examination "but do suggest increased harm in terms of increased numbers of benign lesions identified and an increased number of biopsies performed". They concluded, "At present, screening by breast self-examination or physical examination cannot be recommended."

Although breast self-examination increases the number of biopsies performed on women, it does not reduce mortality from breast cancer. In a large clinical trial involving more than 260,000 female Chinese factory workers, half were carefully taught by nurses at their factories to perform monthly breast self-exam, and the other half were not. The women taught self-exam detected more benign (normal or harmless lumps) or early-stage breast disease, but equal numbers of women died from breast cancer in each group.

Because breast self-exam is not proven to save lives, it is no longer routinely recommended by health authorities for general use. It may be appropriate in women who have a particularly high risk of developing breast cancer. Some charitable organizations still promote BSE as a universal screening approach, even in the low-risk women who are most likely to be harmed by unnecessary follow-up procedures. Writer Gayle A. Sulik, in her book Pink Ribbon Blues, suggests that these charities are motivated by their donations depending on fear of breast cancer. Among groups promoting evidence-based medicine, awareness of breast health and familiarity with one's own body is typically promoted instead of self-exams.

Breast self-examinations are based on the assumption that cancer develops by steady growth of the tumor. According to breast cancer specialist and surgeon Susan Love, "Breast cancer doesn't work like that...it's sneaky. You could examine yourself every day and suddenly find a walnut."

Among women with high-risk BRCA mutations, about 10% said that performing breast self-examination increased their anxiety. Half of those who did perform BSE felt that it gave them a sense of control.

Learning breast self-examination increases a woman's level of depression, worrying, and anxiety about breast cancer. Greater anxiety about breast cancer is associated with a higher likelihood of performing BSE. Women are also more likely to perform BSE if they have experienced a false positive error from screening mammography (being wrongly told that breast cancer may be present, when the woman is actually cancer-free).

== Methods ==
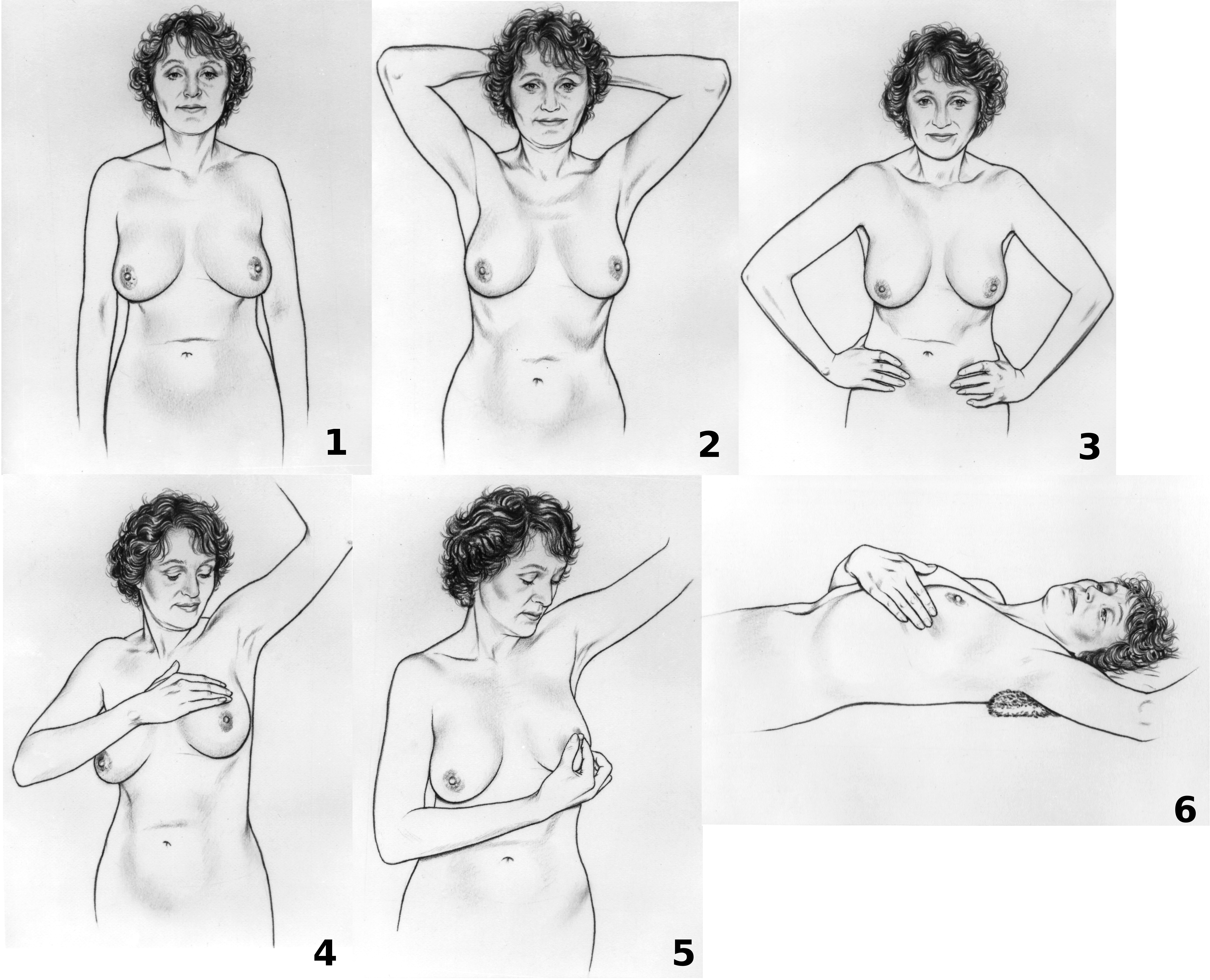
A pictorial example of breast self-examination in six steps. Steps 1-3 involve inspection of the breast with the arms hanging next to the body, behind the head and in the side. Step 4 is palpation of the breast. Step 5 is palpation of the nipple. Step 6 is palpation of the breast while lying down.

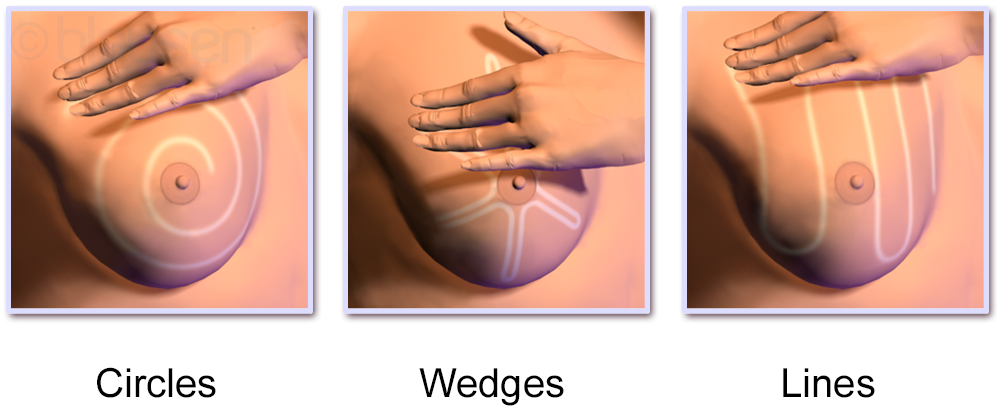
Methods for breast palpation

A variety of methods and patterns are used in breast self-exams. Most methods suggest that the woman stand in front of a mirror with the torso exposed to view. She looks in the mirror for visual signs of dimpling, swelling, or redness on or near the breasts. This is usually repeated in several positions, such as while having hands on the hips, and then again with arms held overhead.

The woman then palpates her breasts with the pads of her fingers to feel for lumps (either superficial or deeper in tissue) or soreness. There are several common patterns, which are designed to ensure complete coverage. The vertical strip pattern involves moving the fingers up and down over the breast. The pie-wedge pattern starts at the nipple and moves outward. The circular pattern involves moving the fingers in concentric circles from the nipple outward. Some guidelines suggest mentally dividing the breast into four quadrants and checking each quadrant separately. The palpation process covers the entire breast, including the "axillary tail" of each breast that extends toward the axilla (armpit). This is usually done once while standing in front of the mirror and again while lying down.

Finally, women that are not breastfeeding gently squeeze each nipple to check for any discharge.

Various mnemonic devices are used as teaching devices. One is called the seven P's of BSE, after seven steps that are named to have the same first initial: Positions, Perimeter, Palpation, Pressure, Pattern, Practice, and Planning what to do if a change is found in the breast tissue.

For pre-menopausal women, most methods suggest that the self-exam be performed at the same stage of the woman's menstrual cycle, because the normal hormone fluctuations can cause changes in the breasts. The most commonly recommended time is just after the end of menstruation, because the breasts are least likely to be swollen and tender at this time. Women who are postmenopausal or have irregular cycles might do a self-exam once a month regardless of their menstrual cycle.

Teaching correctly performed breast self-examinations normally takes a trained professional seven to ten minutes.

== Recommendations ==
The World Health Organization, the Canadian Task Force on Preventive Health Care, and many other scientific organizations recommend against the use of breast self-examinations. Also, the Royal Australian College of General Practitioners states that teaching women to perform breast self-examination is no longer recommended. In the US, however, there is no consensus among organizations related to breast self-examination as the American College of Obstetrics and Gynecology, and the American Medical Association recommend monthly breast self-examination while the American Cancer Society, the National Cancer Institute, the US Preventative Services Task Force, and the National Comprehensive Cancer Network neither recommend nor discourage breast self-examination.

As of 2018, breast self examination was being investigated as to its usefulness as an alternative screening technique in remote areas where women do not have access to regular mammogram tests or comprehensive gynecological care, but more research is required to form a consensus.

== History ==
Activists began promoting breast self-examination in the 1930s because their exhortation to not delay seeking treatment for suspicious lumps was not affecting the death rate.

In the 1950s and 1960s, a film demonstrating breast self-examination, which was co-sponsored by the American Cancer Society and the National Cancer Institute, was shown to millions of American women.

In the 1970s, researchers began to report that women were being told to do this even though there had never been any evidence to suggest that it saved lives.

== See also ==
- Breast cancer awareness
- Mammography
- Testicular self-examination
- Well-woman examination
