= Cancer Diagnostic Probe =

Iranian medical device used in surgeries

The Cancer Diagnostic Probe (CDP) is a medical device used in Iran during breast cancer surgery. First developed by Nano Hesgar Sazan Salamt Arya, an Iranian company, CDP has received medical approval in Iran, where it is used in surgical centers.

== Development and application ==
The Cancer Diagnostic Probe was developed by a team led by Mohammad Abdolahad, a 2019 Mustafa Prize laureate and faculty member of the School of Electrical and Computer Engineering at the University of Tehran, to facilitate the determination of cancerous margins. Abdolahad stated that the clinical trial for the device lasted 4 years and that up to 500 surgeries had been carried out using the CDP by 2020. According to Sayyed Ruhollah Miri, the head of the Cancer Institute at the Tehran University of Medical Sciences, the CDP reduces the diagnosis time to 1–2 minutes.

== Mechanism ==
The CDP device is composed of three main parts: "a disposable sensor; a wireless electrical head probe used by the surgeon; [and] a main control computer system which receives the signals from the head probe". It electrochemically measures the hypoxia glycolysis metabolism in real-time "in pre-cancerous and cancerous lesions in cavity side margins". It measures the release of H_{2}O_{2} from cancer or atypical cells by the reverse Warburg effect.

== Reception ==
The development of CDP was supported by the Iranian Nano Technology Development Headquarters. After receiving medical approval, this system has been used in breast cancer surgeries in Iran. As of 2022, four U.S. patents have been published related to CDP.
