= Breast examination =

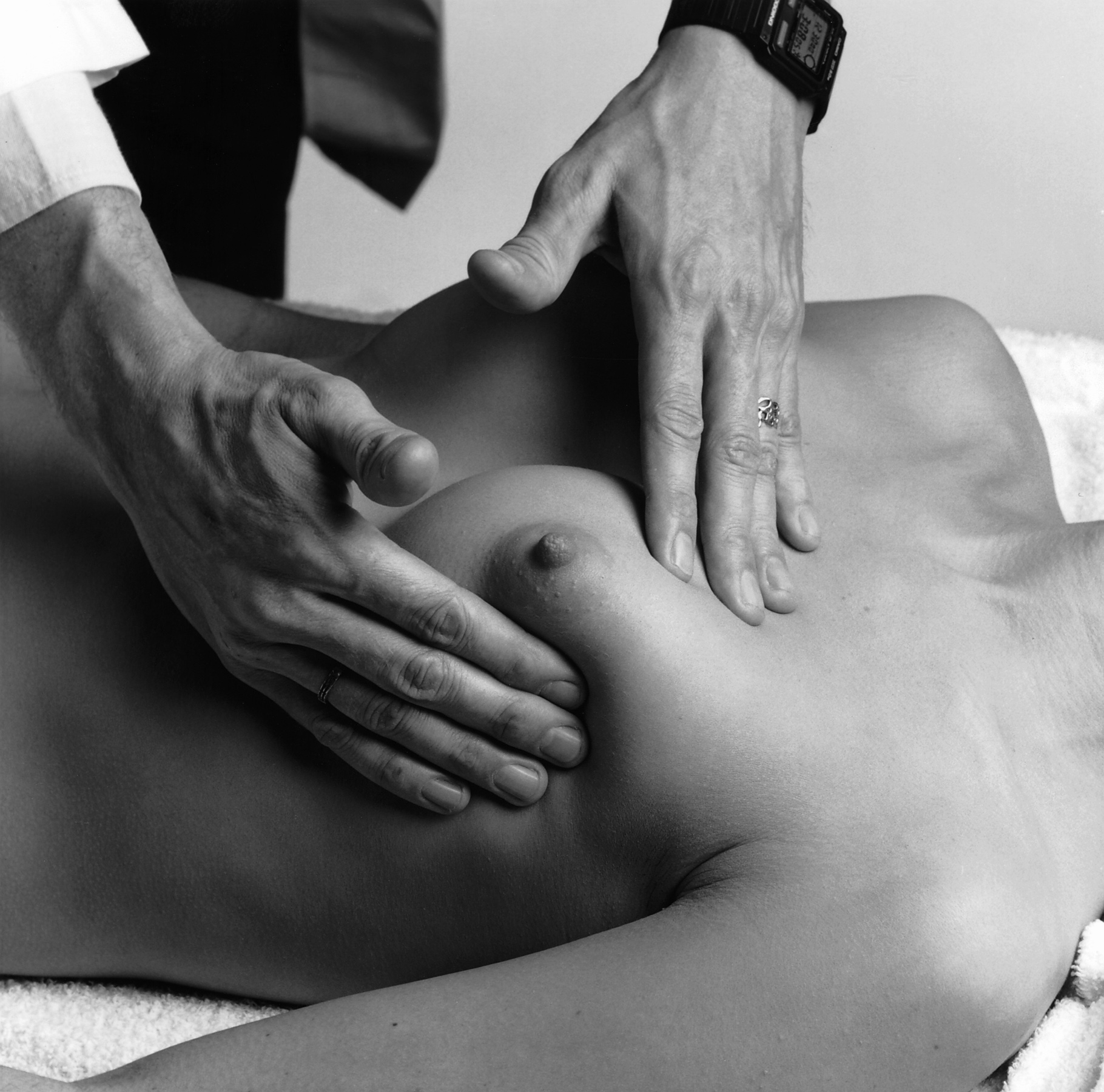
- Clinical breast examination

Breast examination, also known as clinical breast examination, is a physical examination performed by a medical professional on an individual presenting with signs and symptoms in a breast, periodically on some people with a family history of breast disease, or on a person with an incidental abnormal finding on imaging such as mammography. Some organisations recommend a breast examination as part of routine screening, typically in some high risk groups.

Techniques may vary from one medical professional to another, but essentially follow the principles of obtaining informed consent, inspecting and then palpating the breasts, followed by looking for nearby lymph nodes. A chaperone is offered prior to beginning the examination. The method is similar in both males and females.

In 2024, the US Department of Health and Human Services banned breast examination (and pelvic, prostate and rectal exams) without written informed consent, when such exams are done by medical students, nurse practitioners, or physician assistants for “educational and training purposes”.

== Medical use ==
Breast examination is a physical examination performed by a medical professional on an individual presenting with signs and symptoms in a breast, periodically on some people with a family history of breast disease, or on a person with an incidental abnormal finding on imaging such as mammography. Frequently, the individual seeking medical attention has already examined their breasts themselves and found a lump, skin change, pain or nipple discharge.

== Procedure ==
Techniques may vary from one medical professional to another, but essentially follow the principles of obtaining informed consent, inspecting and then palpating the breasts, followed by looking for nearby lymph nodes.

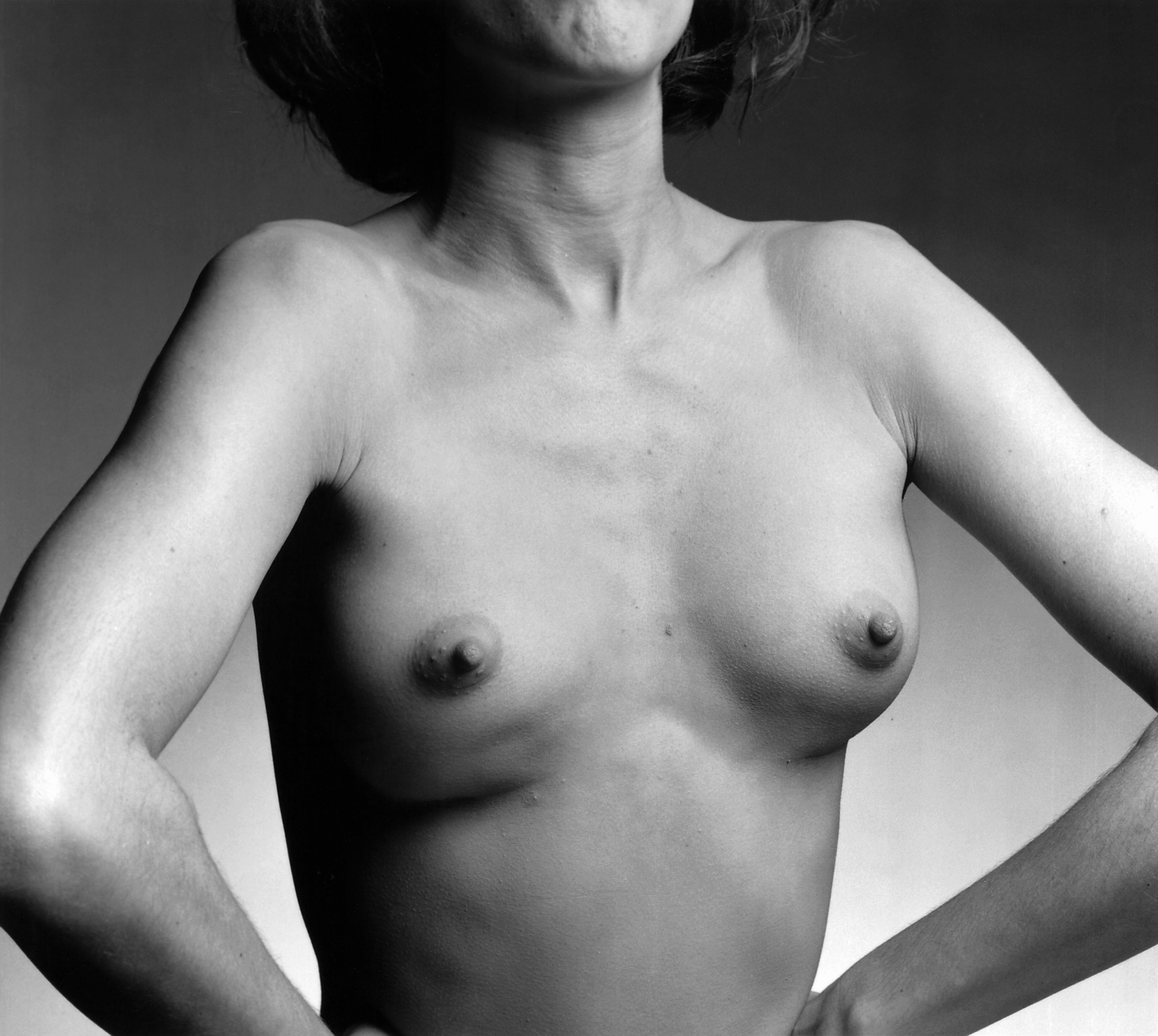
Inspection

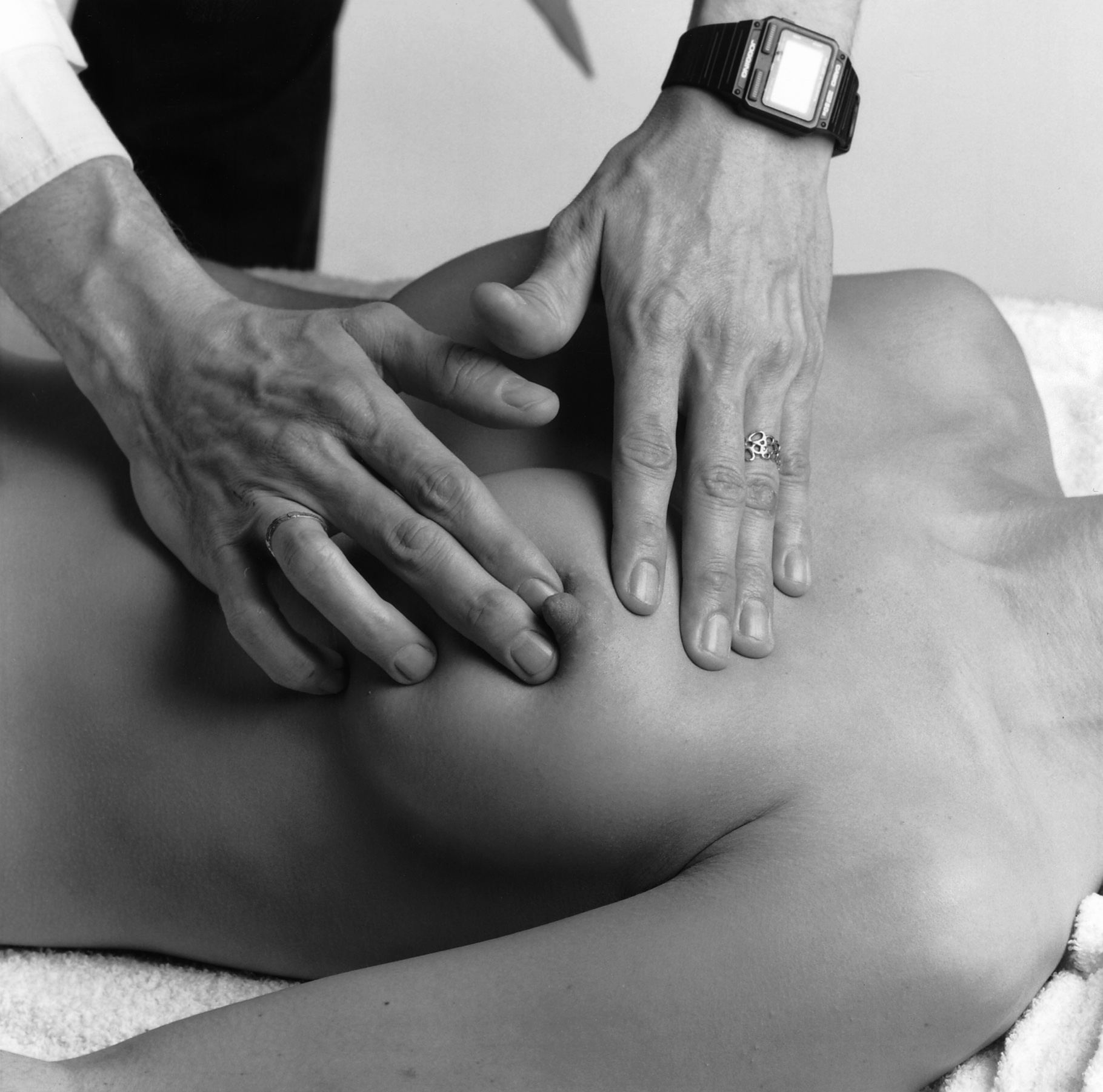
palpation

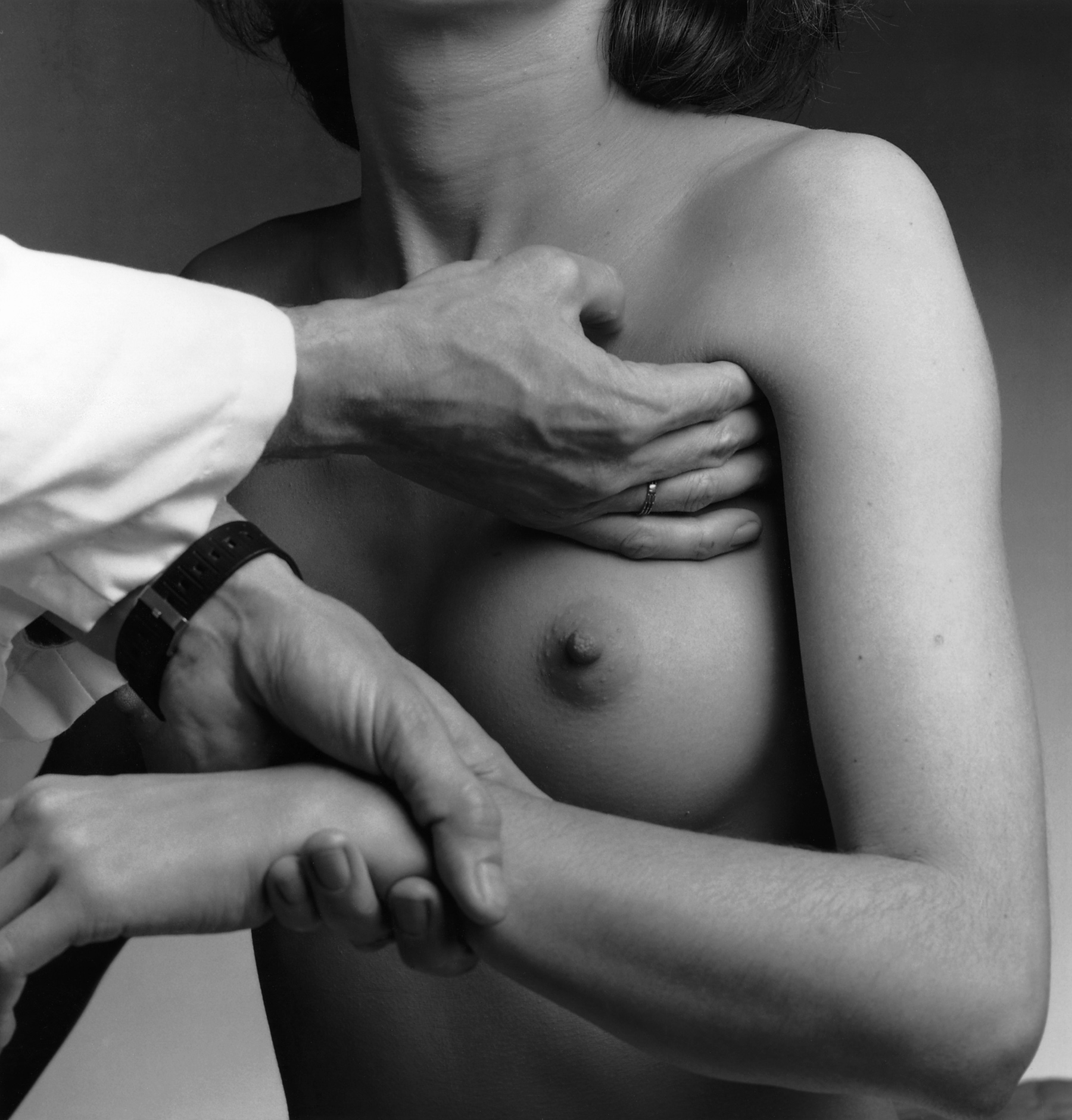
Assess for local lymph nodes

== Findings ==
Breast cancer illustrations

To describe the location of a finding, the nipple is frequently used as a clock face centre and any abnormality is described by the position it would be on a clock, how far it is from the nipple and how deep it is from the skin. Examination findings are generally reported using particular terms; size, symmetry, texture, description of any lump and appearance of skin.
