= Galactocele =

Swelling due to blockage of the mammary glands

- Other names: Lacteal cyst, Lactocele, Galactocoele, Milk cyst
- Specialty: Gynaecology

A galactocele (also called lacteal cyst or milk cyst) is a retention cyst containing milk or a milky substance that is usually located in the mammary glands. They can occur in women during or shortly after lactation.

They present as a firm mass, often subareolar, and are caused by the obstruction of a lactiferous duct. Clinically, they appear similar to a cyst upon examination. The duct becomes more distended over time by epithelial cells and milk. It may rarely be complicated by a secondary infection and result in abscess formation. These cysts may rupture leading to formation of inflammatory reaction and may mimic malignancy.

Once lactation has ended the cyst should resolve on its own without intervention. A galactocele is not normally infected as the milk within is sterile and has no outlet through which to become contaminated. Treatment is by aspiration of the contents or by excision of the cyst. Antibiotics are given to prevent infection.

Galactoceles may be associated with oral contraceptive use. They have been known to present, although rarely, after Breast augmentation and Breast reduction.
