= Diffuse optical mammography =

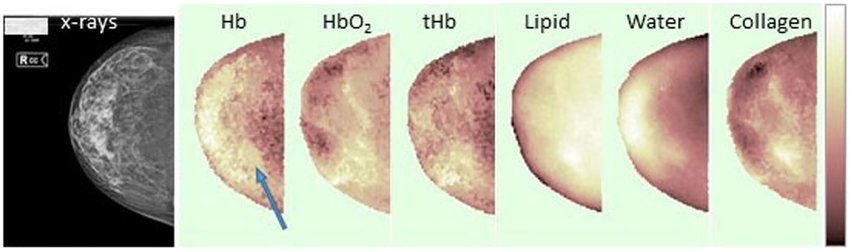
- Example of breast constituents' concentrations maps through optical mammography (right cranio-caudal view). The blue arrow points to the lesion. Hb stands for deoxy-hemoglobin, HbO_{2} for oxy-hemoglobin, tHb for total hemoglobin.
- Purpose: investigation of the breast composition through spectral analysis

Diffuse optical mammography, or simply optical mammography, is an emerging imaging technique that enables the investigation of the breast composition through spectral analysis. It combines in a single non-invasive tool the capability to implement breast cancer risk assessment, lesion characterization, therapy monitoring and prediction of therapy outcome. It is an application of diffuse optics, which studies light propagation in strongly diffusive media, such as biological tissues, working in the red and near-infrared spectral range, between 600 and 1100 nm.

== Comparison with conventional imaging techniques ==
Currently, the most common breast imaging techniques are X-ray mammography, ultrasounds, MRI and PET.

X-ray mammography is widely spread for breast screening, thanks to its high spatial resolution and the short measurement time. However, it is not sensitive to the breast physiology, it is characterized by a limited efficiency in investigating dense breasts and it is harmful due to the use of ionizing radiation. Ultrasounds are non-invasive and they are used especially on young women, who are usually characterized by dense breasts, but the images interpretation depends on the operator's experience. MRI shows a good correlation with the tumour dimensions and is claimed to be the best method for the identification and characterization of lesions. Even though there is no verified long-term health risk from the magnetic fields employed during an MRI, it is not used as first investigative tool because of the high costs and the elevated duration of the exam. Finally, PET allows the early evaluation of the metabolic changes of the tumour, but it is very expensive and requires the administration of a radioactive tracer. For this reason, its application is not frequently recommended.

On the contrary, optical mammography is cheap, efficient also on dense breasts, and devoid of any side effect, so that it can be used to track the evolution of the patient's condition on a daily basis. It is also able to characterize breast from a physiologic point of view. However, being still under development, there is a lack of standardization in data analysis among the research groups dealing with it, and it suffers from low spatial resolution. For this reason, a "multimodal approach" is suggested, where optical mammography is complementary to another conventional technique, so that also the diagnostic efficacy is improved.

== Physical mechanism ==
=== Photon migration in diffusive media ===
Biological tissues are diffusive media, which means that light attenuation during propagation is due not only to absorption, but also to scattering. The former is related to the chemical composition of the medium and induces photon annihilation, whereas the latter depends on the microscopic inhomogeneities of its refractive index and determines deviations in photon's trajectory. The absorption coefficient $\mu_a$ represents the probability per unit length that an absorption event takes place, while the scattering coefficient $\mu_s$ denotes the probability per unit length that a scattering event occurs. However, many studies refer to the reduced scattering coefficient $\mu_s^'=\mu_s (1-g)$ rather than the simple scattering coefficient, in order to take into account the medium's anisotropy. The medium's anisotropy is represented by the factor $g$, which is the average cosine of the angular deflection.

Light propagation through highly diffusive media is typically described through the heuristic approach of the radiative transport theory, sided by the so-called "diffusion approximation": scattering is assumed to be isotropic and strongly dominant over absorption. This is fairly accurate for example for the breast tissue, in the red and near infrared spectral range (between 600 and 1100 nm), known also as "therapeutic window". In the therapeutic window, light can penetrate a few centimetres, so that it can explore the volume at exam. This is the reason why photon migration in biological tissues is known also as "diffuse optics".

The relation between reduced scattering coefficient and wavelength ($\lambda$) derives from the Mie theory:

$\mu'_s = a \left( \frac{ \lambda}{\lambda_0}\right)^{-b}$

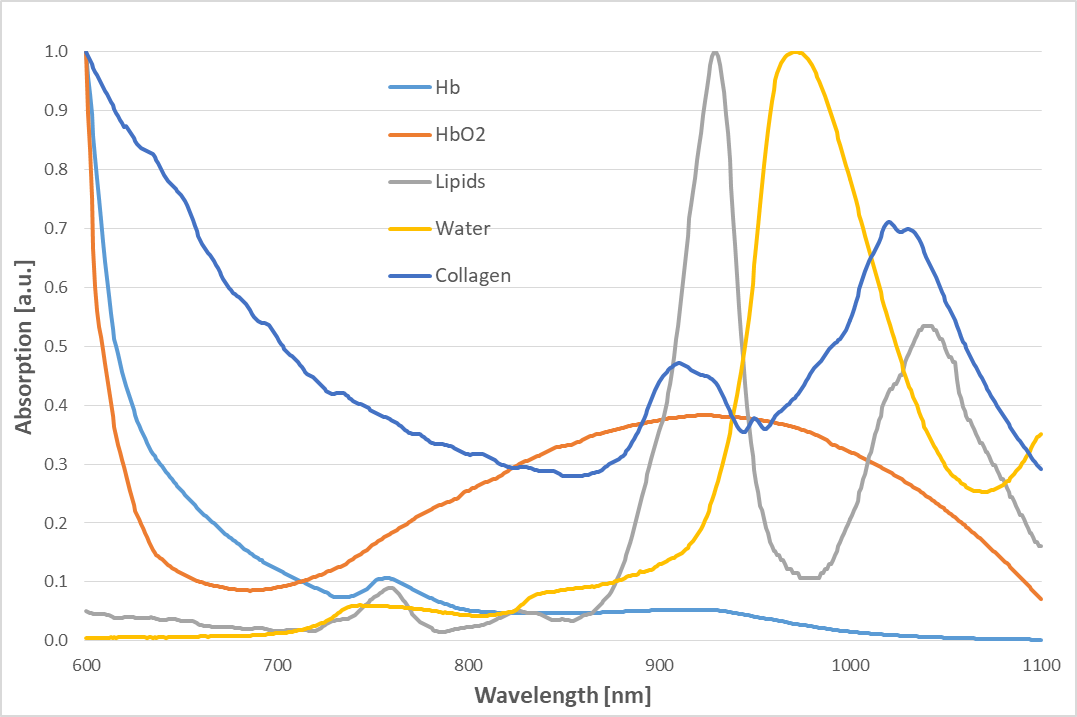
Experimental breast constituent's normalized absorption spectra. Hb stands for deoxy-hemoglobin, HbO2 for oxy-hemoglobin.

where $\lambda_0$ is the reference wavelength and $b$ and $a$ refer to the size of the scattering centres and their density, respectively.

Regarding the absorption coefficient, the relation with $\lambda$ is mediated by the so-called "extinction coefficient" $\epsilon_i(\lambda)$, that in combination with the Lambert-Beer law gives

$\mu_a = \sum_{i} \epsilon_i (\lambda) C_i$

where $C_i$ is the concentration of the i^{th} breast constituent. Measuring $\mu_a$ at different wavelengths, the breast constituents' concentrations can be extrapolated.

=== Breast constituents' absorption spectra ===
The main breast constituents are oxy and deoxy-hemoglobin, water, lipids and collagen. In particular, collagen has been recognized as an independent risk factor for developing breast cancer.

Blood strongly absorbs in the red spectral range, whereas collagen, water and lipids have their absorption peaks at wavelengths longer than 900 nm. The distinction between oxy and deoxy-haemoglobin is due to the presence of a second large peak in the case of oxy-haemoglobin. Lipids are characterized by absorption maxima at 930 nm and 1040 nm, while the wavelength 975 nm is sensitive to water. Finally, an absorption peak for collagen takes place at 1030 nm.

== Possible implementations ==
Diffuse optical mammography can be implemented exploiting three different approaches: time domain, frequency domain and continuous wave. Moreover, there exist two main geometries to perform an optical measurement:

- Reflectance: injection and collection occur on the same side of the breast. The woman is usually prone or bent forward and places the breast on a support provided with a hole where sources and detectors are located. Other systems' setups instead require the woman to lie supine and the measurement is carried out with a hand-held probe.
- Transmittance: injection and collection occur on opposite sides of the breast. The breast is usually compressed between plane parallel plates.

Whatever the chosen approach is, any optical mammograph must comprehend some essential elements: laser sources, a detector, a signal processor.

The use of multiple laser sources allows to investigate the breast constituents' concentrations of interest, by selecting some specific wavelengths. Detectors are usually photomultiplier tubes or avalanche photodiodes. Finally, the signal processor could be a device for Time-correlated single photon counting in the case of a time-resolved optical mammograph, or a filter for frequency modulation in the case of frequency-domain ones.

Based on the number and position of sources and detectors, an optical mammograph can produce bidimensional or three-dimensional breast constituents' maps.

=== Time domain ===
In time-domain measurements, short light pulses of the order of hundreds of picoseconds are delivered to the breast and its optical properties are retrieved from the features of the re-emitted pulses, which have undergone delay, broadening and attenuation. Time-correlated single photon counting is fundamental to cope with the low-level output signal.

=== Frequency domain ===
In frequency-domain measurements, an intensity-modulated signal is injected into the breast and its optical properties are deduced from the dephasement and the demodulation of the output signal with respect to the input one. The measurement is repeated for different values of the frequency modulation.

=== Continuous wave ===
In continuous wave (CW) measurements, the light source is a continuous wave laser, which hinders the separation of the absorption and scattering contributions with a single measurement. A possible solution is to perform space or angle-resolved measurements. In general, the CW approach is combined with the frequency domain one, in order to reinforce the strengths of both.

== Potential applications ==
=== Breast cancer risk assessment ===
A denser breast is more likely to develop breast cancer. A dense breast is characterized by a meaningful amount of fibrous tissue, relatively to the adipose one. The main constituents of a fibrous tissue are water, collagen and hemoglobin and optical mammography is able to discriminate and quantify tissues' components. Therefore, by measuring breast constituents' concentrations, optical mammography could assess breast cancer risk.

=== Lesion characterization ===
Tumours are generally made of fibrous tissue and could be recognized in the constituents' maps as local spots with higher concentrations of water, collagen and hemoglobin with respect to the surrounding, mostly adipose, healthy tissues. Studies demonstrate that the variation in concentration with respect to the healthy tissue is statistically more marked in the case of malignant tumours than benign ones. In addition, the scattering coefficient is generally higher for benign lesions. Such distinctions suggest that optical mammography could characterize breast lesions.

=== Therapy monitoring and prediction of therapy outcome ===
Breast cancer management depends on the characteristics of the tumour and the patient's condition. One of the possible strategies is the administration of neoadjuvant therapy, whose goal is to shrink the tumour size before surgery. Studies show that if the therapy is efficient, then the water, collagen and hemoglobin contents of the lesion show a decreasing behaviour over time, which suggests that the initially fibrous tissue acquires features similar to the adipose one. Optical measurements in correspondence with therapy sessions could track its evolution, so to assess the patient's response to it. Moreover, it is believed that therapy effectiveness could be predicted even on the first day of treatment on the base of initial breast constituents' concentrations.

== See also ==
- Breast imaging
- Diffuse optical imaging
- Optical tomography
- Radiative transfer equation and diffusion theory for photon transport in biological tissue
- Near-infrared window in biological tissue
- Time-domain diffuse optics
- Computed tomography laser mammography
