= Medical optical imaging =

Use of light for medical investigation

Medical optical imaging is the use of light as an investigational imaging technique for medical applications, pioneered by American Physical Chemist Britton Chance. Examples include optical microscopy, spectroscopy, endoscopy, scanning laser ophthalmoscopy, laser Doppler imaging, optical coherence tomography, and transdermal optical imaging. Because light is an electromagnetic wave, similar phenomena occur in X-rays, microwaves, and radio waves.

Optical imaging systems may be divided into diffusive and ballistic imaging systems. A model for photon migration in turbid biological media has been developed by Bonner et al. Such a model can be applied for interpretation data obtained from laser Doppler blood-flow monitors and for designing protocols for therapeutic excitation of tissue chromophores.

== Diffusive optical imaging ==
Diffuse optical imaging (DOI) is a method of imaging using near-infrared spectroscopy (NIRS) or fluorescence-based methods. When used to create 3D volumetric models of the imaged material DOI is referred to as diffuse optical tomography, whereas 2D imaging methods are classified as diffuse optical topography.

The technique has many applications to neuroscience, sports medicine, wound monitoring, and cancer detection. Typically DOI techniques monitor changes in concentrations of oxygenated and deoxygenated hemoglobin and may additionally measure redox states of cytochromes. The technique may also be referred to as diffuse optical tomography (DOT), near-infrared optical tomography (NIROT) or fluorescence diffuse optical tomography (FDOT), depending on the usage.

In neuroscience, functional measurements made using NIR wavelengths, DOI techniques may classify as functional near-infrared spectroscopy (fNIRS).

== Ballistic optical imaging ==
Ballistic photons are the light photons that travel through a scattering (turbid) medium in a straight line. Also known as ballistic light. If laser pulses are sent through a turbid medium such as fog or body tissue, most of the photons are either randomly scattered or absorbed. However, across short distances, a few photons pass through the scattering medium in straight lines. These coherent photons are referred to as ballistic photons. Photons that are slightly scattered, retaining some degree of coherence, are referred to as snake photons.

If efficiently detected, there are many applications for ballistic photons especially in coherent high resolution medical imaging systems. Ballistic scanners (using ultrafast time gates) and optical coherence tomography (OCT) (using the interferometry principle) are just two of the popular imaging systems that rely on ballistic photon detection to create diffraction-limited images. Advantages over other existing imaging modalities (e.g., ultrasound and magnetic resonance imaging) is that ballistic imaging can achieve a higher resolution in the order of 1 to 10 micro-meters, however it has limited imaging depth. Furthermore, more scattered 'quasi-ballistic' photons are often measured as well to increase the signal 'strength' (i.e., signal-to-noise ratio).

Due to the exponential reduction (with respect to distance) of ballistic photons in a scattering medium, often image processing techniques are applied to the raw captured ballistic images, to reconstruct high quality ones. Ballistic imaging modalities aim to reject non-ballistic photons and retain ballistic photons that carry useful information. To perform this task, specific characteristics of ballistic photons vs. non-ballistic photons are used, such as time of flight through coherence gated imaging, collimation, wavefront propagation, and polarization.

== See also ==
- Ballistic photon
- Diffuse optical imaging
- Optical coherence tomography
- Optical tomography
- Photon diffusion
- Photon diffusion equation
- Laser Doppler imaging
