= Time-domain diffuse optics =

Branch of functional near infra-red spectrosocpy

Time-domain diffuse optics or time-resolved functional near-infrared spectroscopy is a branch of functional near-Infrared spectroscopy which deals with light propagation in diffusive media. There are three main approaches to diffuse optics, namely continuous-wave (CW), frequency-domain (FD), and time-domain (TD). Biological tissues are transparent to light in the range of red to near-infrared wavelengths, so these colors can be used to probe deep layers of the tissue, thus enabling various in vivo applications and clinical trials.

== Physical concepts ==
In this approach, a narrow pulse of light (< 100 picoseconds) is injected into the medium. The injected photons undergo multiple scattering and absorption events; the scattered photons are then collected at a certain distance from the source, and the photon arrival times are recorded. The photon arrival times are converted into the histogram of the distribution of time-of-flight (DTOF) of photons or temporal point spread function. This DTOF is delayed, attenuated, and broadened with respect to the injected pulse. The two main phenomena affecting photon migration in diffusive media are absorption and scattering. Scattering is caused by microscopic refractive index changes due to the structure of the media. Absorption, on the other hand, is caused by a radiative or non-radiative transfer of light energy on interaction with absorption centers such as chromophores. Absorption and scattering are described by coefficients $\mu_a$and $\mu_s$, respectively.

Multiple scattering events broaden the DTOF and the attenuation of a result of both absorption and scattering, as they divert photons from the direction of the detector. Higher scattering leads to a broader and more delayed DTOF, and higher absorption reduces the amplitude and changes the slope of the tail of the DTOF. Since absorption and scattering have different effects on the DTOF, they can be extracted independently while using a single source-detector separation. Moreover, the penetration depth in TD depends solely on the photon arrival times and is independent of the source-detector separation, unlike in the CW approach.

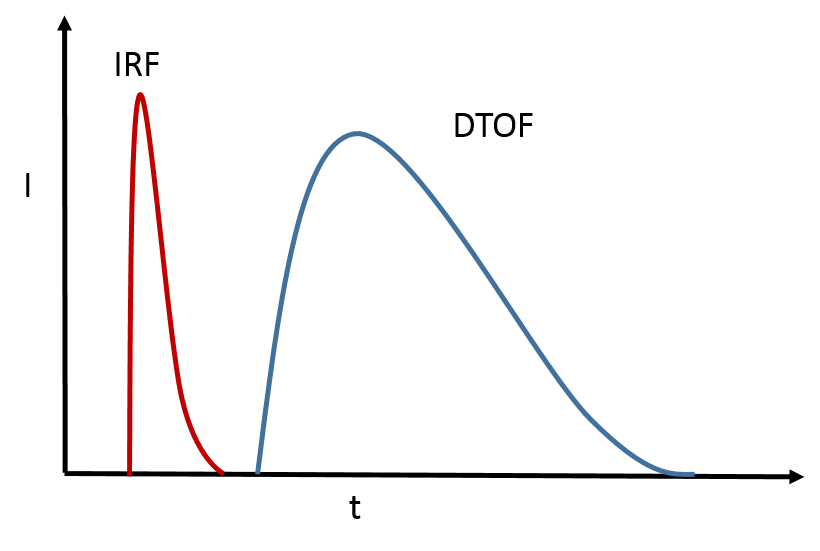
Injected instrument response function and the reconstructed DTOF

The theory of light propagation in diffusive media is usually dealt with using the framework of radiative transfer theory under the multiple-scattering regime. It has been demonstrated that radiative transfer equation under the diffusion approximation yields sufficiently accurate solutions for practical applications. For example, it can be applied for the semi-infinite geometry or the infinite slab geometry, using proper boundary conditions. The system is considered as a homogeneous background and an inclusion is considered as an absorption or scattering perturbation.

The time-resolved reflectance curve at a point $\rho$ from the source for a semi-infinite geometry is given by

$R(\rho, t)=k t^{-5 / 2} \exp \left(-\mu_{a} \nu t\right) \exp \left(-\frac{\rho^{2}}{4 D \nu t}\right) S\left(D, s_{0}, t\right),$

where $D=\frac{1}{3 \mu_{s}^{\prime}}$ is the diffusion coefficient, $\mu_{s}^{\prime}=\mu_{s}(1-g)$ is the reduced scattering coefficient, $g$ is asymmetry factor, $\nu$ is the photon velocity in the medium, $S(D,s_0,t)$ takes into account the boundary conditions, and $k$ is a constant.

The final DTOF is a convolution of the instrument response function (IRF) of the system with the theoretical reflectance curve.

When applied to biological tissues, estimation of $\mu_a$ and $\mu'_s$ then allows estimation the concentration of the various tissue constituents as well as provides information about blood oxygenation (oxy- and deoxy-hemoglobin), saturation, and total blood volume. These can then be used as biomarkers for detecting various pathologies.

== Instrumentation ==
Instrumentation in time-domain diffuse optics consists of three fundamental components: a pulsed laser source, a single-photon detector, and timing electronics.

=== Sources ===
Time-domain diffuse optical sources must have the following characteristics: emission wavelength in the optical window (650–1350 nm); a narrow full width at half maximum (FWHM), ideally a delta function; high repetition rate (>20 MHz); and sufficient laser power (>1 mW) to achieve good signal-to-noise ratio.

In the past, bulky tunable Ti:sapphire lasers were used. They provided a wide wavelength range of 400 nm, a narrow FWHM (< 1 ps), high average power (up to 1W), and high repetition rate (up to 100 MHz). However, they are bulky and expensive, and take a long time for wavelength swapping.

In recent years, pulsed fiber lasers based on supercontinuum generation have emerged. They provide a wide spectral range (400 to 2000 ps), typical average power of 5 to 10 W, a FWHM of < 10ps, and a repetition frequency of tens of MHz. However, they are generally quite expensive and lack stability in supercontinuum generation and hence have been limited in their use.

The most widespread sources are pulsed diode lasers. They have a FWHM of around 100 ps, repetition frequency of up to 100 MHz, and an average power of about a few milliwatts. Even though they lack tunability, their low cost and compactness allows for multiple modules to be used in a single system.

=== Detectors ===
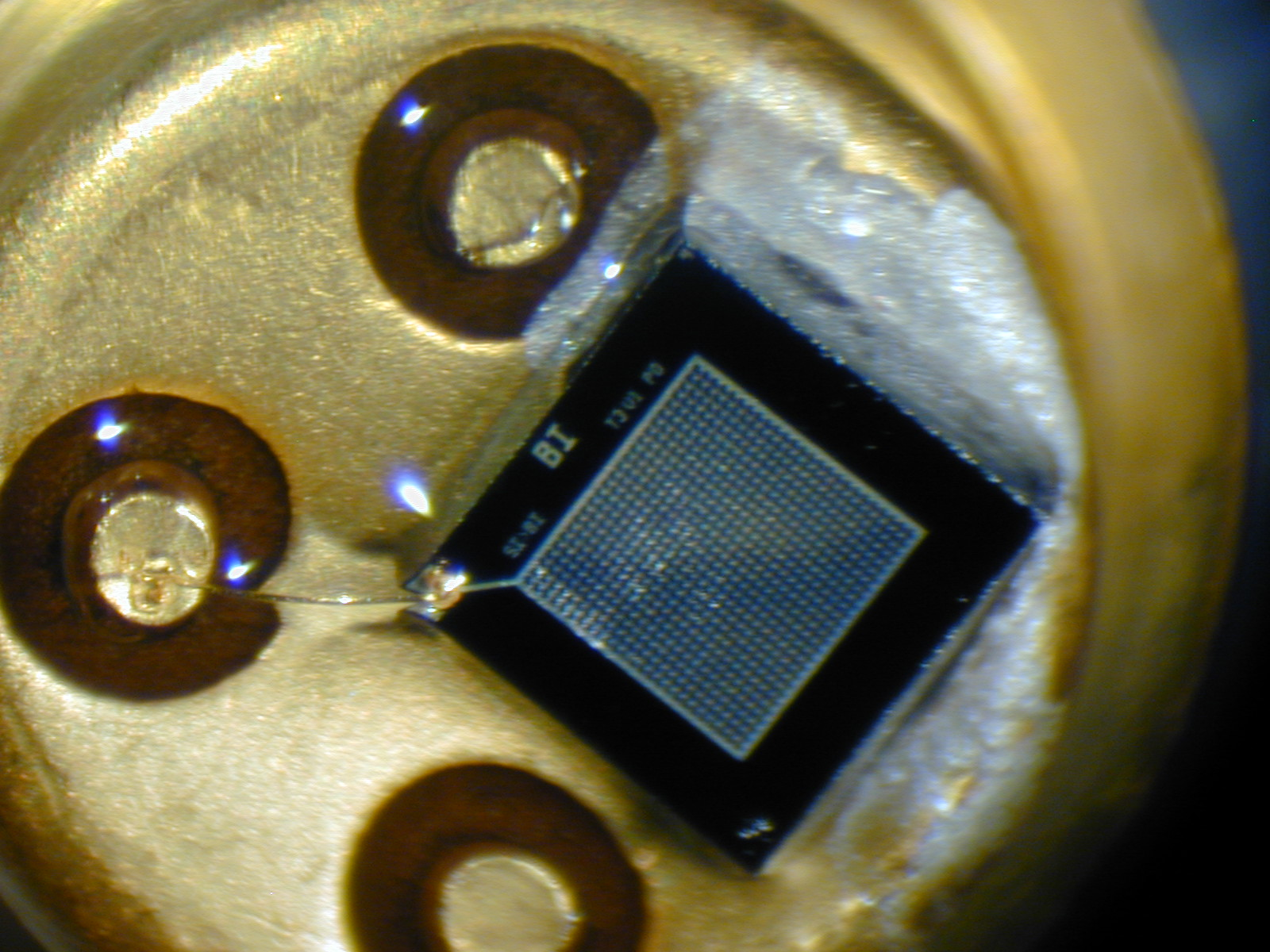
Silicon photomultiplier

Single-photon detectors used in time-domain diffuse optics require not only a high photon-detection efficiency in optical wavelengths, but also a large active area and large numerical aperture (N.A.) to maximize the overall light-collection efficiency. They also require a narrow timing response and a low noise background.

Traditionally, fiber-coupled photomultiplier tubes (PMT) have been the detector of choice for diffuse optical measurements, thanks mainly due to the large active area, low dark count, and excellent timing resolution. However, they are intrinsically bulky, are prone to electromagnetic disturbances, and have a quite limited spectral sensitivity. Moreover, they require a high biasing voltage and are quite expensive. Single-photon avalanche diodes have emerged as an alternative to PMTS. They are low-cost and compact, and can be placed in contact, while needing a much lower biasing voltage. Also, they offer a wider spectral sensitivity and are more robust to bursts of light. However, they have a much lower active area and hence a lower photon-collection efficiency and a larger dark count. Silicon photomultipliers (SiPM) are an arrays of SPADs with a global anode and a global cathode and hence have a larger active area while maintaining all the advantages offered by SPADs. However, they suffer from a larger dark count and a broader timing response.

=== Timing electronics ===
Timing electronics are needed to losslessly reconstruct the histogram of the distribution of time-of-flight of photons. This is done by using the technique of time-correlated single-photon counting (TCSPC), where the individual photon arrival times are marked with respect to a start/stop signal provided by the periodic laser cycle. These time-stamps can then be used to build up histograms of photon arrival times.

The two main types of timing electronics are based on a combination of time-to-analog converter (TAC) and an analog-to-digital converter (ADC), and time-to-digital converter (TDC), respectively. In the first case, the difference between the start and stop signals is converted into an analog voltage signal, which is then processed by the ADC. In the second method, the delay is directly converted into a digital signal. Systems based on ADCs generally have a better timing resolution, linearity, and the capability of being integrated, but are expensive. TDCs, on the other hand, can be integrated into a single chip and hence are better suited in multi-channel systems. However, they have a worse timing performance and can handle much lower sustained count-rates.

== Applications ==
The usefulness of time-domain diffuse optics lies in its ability to continually and noninvasively monitor optical properties of tissue, making it a powerful diagnostic tool for long-term bedside monitoring in infants and adults alike. It has already been demonstrated that TD diffuse optics can be successfully applied to various biomedical applications such as cerebral monitoring, optical mammography, muscle monitoring, etc.

== See also ==
- Near-infrared spectroscopy
- Functional near-infrared spectroscopy
- Diffuse optical imaging
- Neuroimaging
- Functional neuroimaging
