= UGC 2812 =

Interacting galaxies in the constellation Eridanus

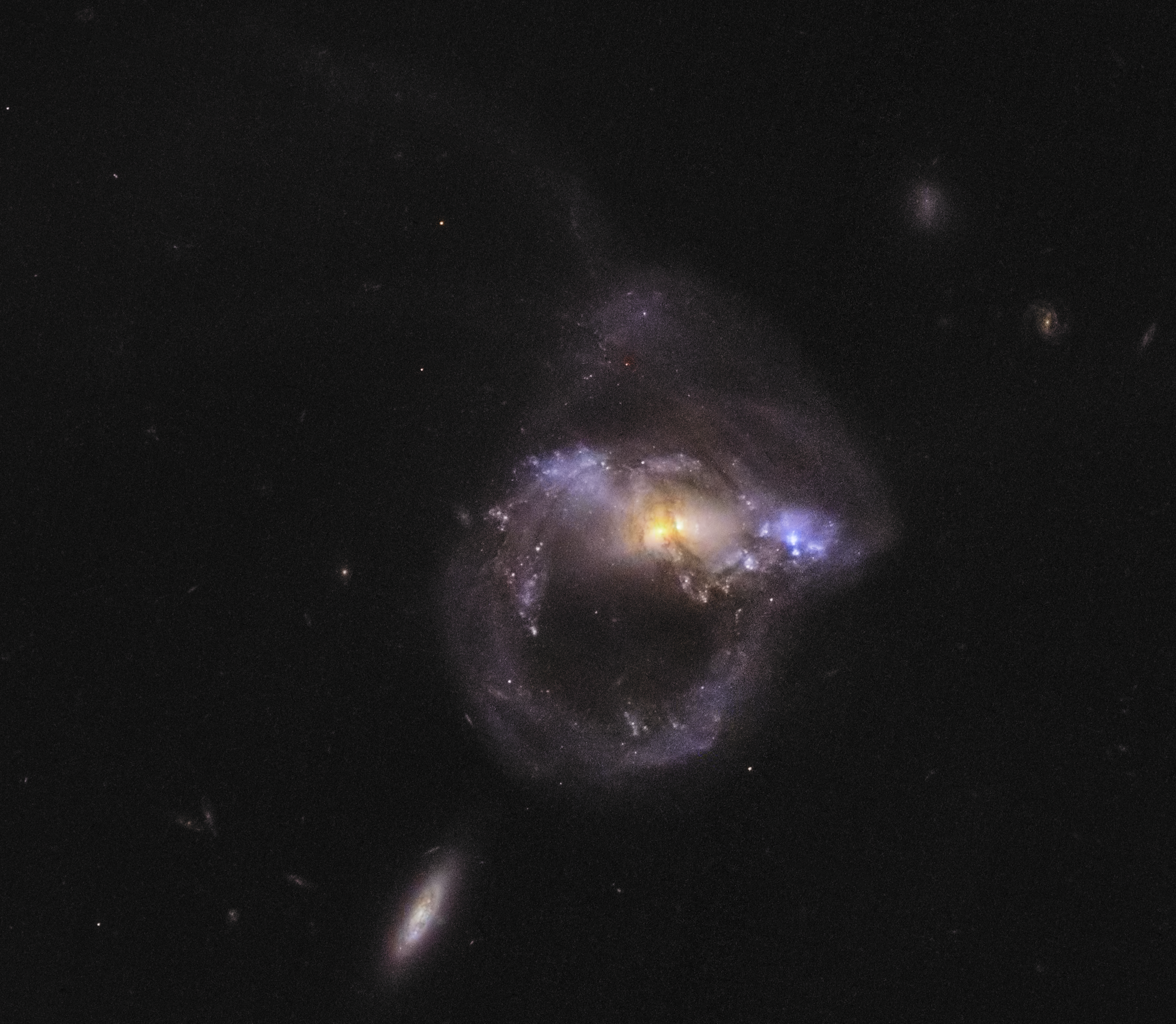
- UGC 2812 captured by Hubble Space Telescope (brightness) and Pan-STARRS (color)

Observation data (J2000 epoch)
- Constellation: Eridanus
- Right ascension: 03^{h} 39^{m} 54.1^{s}
- Declination: −02° 07′ 06″
- Redshift: 0.035094
- Heliocentric radial velocity: 10,521 km/s
- Distance: 471 Mly (144.4 Mpc)
- Apparent magnitude (V): 14.4

Characteristics
- Type: SB+COMP
- Size: 1.0' x 0.7'
- Notable features: Interacting galaxy

Other designations
- PGC 13489, Arp 219, VV 495, CGCG 391-024, MCG +00-10-009, IRAS F03373-0216, NVSS J033952-020657

UGC 2812 known as Arp 219, are a pair of interacting galaxies located 470 million light-years away in the constellation Eridanus. Both galaxies appeared to be distorted and tangled with each other which suggests their inevitable merging to form an elliptical galaxy. Moreover, they present a near-infrared spectra which could result from starbursts. Both objects are part of Atlas of Peculiar galaxies, where they are categorized under galaxies that have adjacent loops which are a manifestation of structures that were formed by gravitational interactions.
