= Photon diffusion =

The scattering of photons upon contacting a material.

Photon diffusion is an approximate description of how light spreads through a material in which scattering is much more common than absorption. In such media, photons undergo many successive scattering events, which repeatedly change their direction of travel. Over many interactions, the path of an individual photon can be described statistically as a random walk.

When large numbers of photons are considered together, their overall transport behaves in a way similar to diffusion. In this regime, the distribution of light energy spreads through the material in a manner that can be described using a diffusion equation. This approximation is derived from the more general radiative transfer equation and is valid when the material is optically thick and scattering dominates over absorption.

This description is commonly used in modeling light propagation in media such as biological tissue, clouds, and other materials where repeated scatterings strongly influences how light moves through the system.

== Astrophysics ==
In astrophysics, photon diffusion occurs inside a stellar atmosphere. To describe this phenomenon, one should develop the transfer equation in moments and use the Eddington approximation to radiative transfer (i.e. the diffusion approximation). In 3D the results are two equations for the photon energy flux:

$$\vec F = -\frac{c}{12\pi\sigma}\vec \nabla U,$$
$$\vec \nabla \cdot \vec F = 0,$$

where $\sigma$ is the opacity. By substituting the first equation into the second, one obtains the diffusion equation for the photon energy density:

$$\nabla^2 U -\frac{1}{\sigma}\vec \nabla U \cdot \vec \nabla \sigma=0.$$

== Medical science ==
In medicine, the diffusion of photons can be used to create images of the body (mainly brain and breast) and has contributed much to the advance of certain fields of research, such as neuroscience. This technique is known as diffuse optical imaging.

== See also ==
- Diffuse reflection
- Diffusion damping
- Global dimming
- Medical optical imaging
- Optical tomography
- Radiative transfer equation and diffusion theory for photon transport in biological tissue
