= Spatial frequency domain imaging =

Non-invasive imaging technique

Spatial Frequency Domain Imaging (SFDI) is a non-invasive optical imaging method that uses spatially modulated light to extract quantitative information about tissue properties. Its large field of view coupled with its quantitative approach to imaging has made it a novel imaging modality, with many use cases in murine pre-clinical trials. Its clinical relevance in human medical practice so far has been limited, but there are currently outstanding clinical trials in their recruitment phase for the use of the technology.

== Methodology ==
In spatial frequency domain imaging, the project utilizes either visible or near infrared light as its source. The source projector is positioned obliquely to the field of view being imaging. The camera which receives the output is positioned perpendicular to the field of view. In regard to the properties of the light, it can be represented as a function of wavelength, spatial frequency, and angle of the incidence (λ,f_{x},θ). The light will project onto the media where the transmitted and reflected light will then be received by the camera. In order to qualify as SFDI imaging, at least two spatial frequencies must be used in imaging.

== Processing ==
The raw output obtained through SFDI will give a raw output in DC and AC modes, with the DC mode usually being a 0 mm^{−1} representation, while the AC mode will be the raw output obtained at a higher spatial frequency. From there demodulation, surface correction, and calibration takes place. The mapping and demodulation of the image is based on a LUT (Look-up Table) derived from photon Monte Carlo simulations. Diffuse reflectance is calculated using the following two equations:

(1) $W_n = exp(-\mu_{a,1}d_{1,n} - \mu_{a,2}d_{2,n})exp(-2\pi i f_x x_n)$

(2) $R_d(f_x)= \frac{1}{N}\sum\limits_{n=1}^N W_n$

Using the calculated diffuse reflectance and derived LUT, single-pixel demodulation is used to map reduced scattering coefficient and absorption coefficient at every pixel in the image. From there, insight dependent processing can reveal quantitative markers such as scattering amplitude or scattering power, which can be preferred lenses for image analysis. This is possible due to known chromophore extinction coefficient for deoxygenated and oxygenated hemoglobin.

== Uses ==
Current uses of the technology have mostly centered around preclinical studies of tumor-infected mice. There have been many such studies intending to show the proficiency of the technology in evaluating optical property change in tumors over time. These studies have employed anticancer drug treatments including CPA and DC101 on tumor infected mice and have demonstrated the ability to reveal the efficacy of cytotoxic and anti-angiogenic therapies. This is particularly significant as the development of in vivo, non-invasive evaluation techniques mean there is at the very least research potential for the technology, and in the best case, treatment potential. In terms of clinical trials involving humans, SFDI has been used to examine burn wounds, nonmelanoma skin cancer, and skin photodamage, but has not been used in in-vivo cancer studies. A study published in 2026 demonstrated the practicality of using this method to objectively and non-invasively measure skin involvement in systemic scleroderma.

== Advantages & Limitations ==
One advantage of SFDI is its quantitative approach to optical property analysis, favoring numerical insights over qualitative ones. As with many optical imaging technologies, it is non-invasive as does not pose any significant risks to the patient. The large field of view coupled with the high spatial resolution means that a large area can precisely imaged. The source properties of the light are also very adaptable, with multi-wavelength, multi-frequency, and multi-phase combination possibilities.

Some of the limitations of SFDI include its limited depth, which is a persistent problem in optical imaging. The imaging and processing techniques can also become labor-intensive and expensive under certain settings, reducing the feasible range of applications. There has also been limited clinical implementation so far, and new clinical trials demonstrating use cases in the cancer research space will be needed for SFDI to prove its usefulness.
