= Computed tomography laser mammography =

Medical imaging technique

Computed tomography laser mammography (CTLM) is the trademark of Imaging Diagnostic Systems, Inc. (IDSI, United States) for its optical tomographic technique for female breast imaging.

This medical imaging technique uses laser energy in the near-infrared region of the spectrum to detect angiogenesis in the breast tissue. It is optical molecular imaging for hemoglobin, both oxygenated and deoxygenated. The technology uses laser in the same way computed tomography uses X-rays; the beams travel through tissue and suffer attenuation.

A laser detector measures the intensity drop and the data is collected as the laser detector moves across the breast creating a tomography image. CTLM images show hemoglobin distribution in a tissue and can detect areas of angiogenesis surrounding malignant tumors, that stimulate this angiogenesis to obtain nutrients for growth.

== History ==
Breast cancer affects 1 in 8 women, and an estimated 27% of people live at least 5 years after being diagnosed with stage IV cancer according to the National Cancer Institute. Mammography is the most commonly used method to screen for cancer, but there are three major drawbacks. The first is ionizing radiation. Since mammography uses low-energy x-rays to image the breast, the breast is exposed to ionizing radiation. Too much repeated exposure can elevate the risk of cancer down the road. The second drawback is inaccuracy. Mammography has low specificity and this can lead to false positives, which detect abnormalities that never progress to cause symptoms or death and also false negatives, especially in dense breast tissue, when it is especially difficult to detect tumors. 60 to 80 out of every 100 biopsies performed after mammography are actually negative for cancer. Lastly, pain is a major drawback to mammography. 23–95% experience discomfort, and pain is a significant inhibitor to re-attending screenings.

CTLM was therefore developed as an alternative to X-ray mammography. Its technology is based on two important principles:

1. Different tissues have different absorption coefficients
2. Malignant tumors have high rates of neovascularization

Neovascularization is the natural formation of new blood vessels.

CTLM takes 15–20 minutes per picture and uses non-ionizing near-infrared light, which allows patients to take repeat images. It also suspends the breast, which prevents pain while imaging.

It is undergoing FDA approval, and is proposed as an adjunct to mammography.

== Mechanism ==
CTLM is a non-invasive practical system that uses near-infrared laser light propagation through the tissue to assess its optical properties. It is based on two basic principles: different tissue components have unique scattering and absorption characteristics for each wavelength and the malignant tumor growth requires neovascularization to grow beyond 2 mm in size. In new forming tumors, the blood flow increases and the CTLM then looks for high hemoglobin concentration (angiogenesis) in the breast that are structurally and functionally abnormal, and to detect neovascularization, which may be hidden in mammography images especially in dense breast. This neovascularization, which results in a greater volume of hemoglobin in a confined area, can be visualized using absorption measurements of laser light. Malignant lesions will be detected based on their higher optical attenuation compared to the surrounding tissue, which is mainly related to the increase in light absorption by their higher hemoglobin content.

The CTLM device uses a laser diode than emits laser light at an 808 nm wavelength in the near-infrared (NIR) spectrum that matches the crossover point of strong absorption of both oxygenated and deoxygenated hemoglobin. At this wavelength, water, fat, and skin can only weakly absorb light, having little effect on data acquisition. The 808 nm laser beam can penetrate breast tissue of any density, and thus can work equally well in the examination and imaging of extremely dense and heterogeneous breast tissue. CTLM looks for the areas of high absorption, where there is a high hemoglobin concentration indicating rich network of blood vessels, or angiogenesis. The area of angiogenesis is generally much larger than the tumor itself, and hence CTLM can detect small tumors that are sometimes invisible if using other imaging modalities, such as mammogram. However, the dispersion of photons in the tissue, although safe, can create a problem in the prediction of the path of the light in the tissue due to scattering. To solve this problem, CTLM system uses a large number of source and detector positions to take into account the diffusion approximation of light propagation in tissue, and to show the location of the increased vascularity in the breast.

The data acquisition of CTLM is very similar to standard computed tomography (CT). The major difference is that CTLM uses near-infrared light, not X-ray, to produce the images. The patient lies on a padded table in the prone position with one breast suspended in the scanning chamber with nothing in contact with the pendant breast. The breast is surrounded by the laser source-detector unit that consists of a well containing two rings with 84 detectors each and a single laser mounted on a circular platform. This working array of CTLM device rotates 360 degrees around the breast and takes approximately 16,000 absorption measurements per slice. It then descends to scan the next level after each rotation, creating a slice at each step of thickness 2 or 4 mm, depending on the size of the breast. A total of at least 10 slices is obtained, and the duration of the examination ranges from 10 to 15 minutes for an average-sized patient.

Reconstruction of the CTLM images is performed slice by slice. The forward model, an estimate of the average optical absorption, is computed for each slice, using the diffusion approximation of the transport equation. It is then compared to the computed tomographic fan-beam measurement of the absorbing perturbations in the slice. These perturbation data are then reconstructed into slice images using a highly modified proprietary filtered back-projection algorithm that converts the fan-beam data into sinograms. It also corrects for geometric distortions due to bulk light-tissue interaction, and compensates for a spatially variant blurring effect that is typical of diffuse optical imaging.

3D images visualization is available immediately after data acquisition. The areas containing well-perfused structures with high hemoglobin concentration are visualized in white or light green, and the areas with no vascularization are seen as dull green or black. Mathematical algorithms reconstruct three-dimensional translucent images that can be rotated along any axis in real time. In 3D space, the images are analyzed in two different projections, maximum intensity projection (MIP) and front to back projection (FTB), also known as a Surface Rendering Mode. These two modes combined are used to evaluate the vascularization patterns and to distinguish a normal vessel from an abnormal vascularization. Although some benign lesion also showed angiogenesis, increased absorption was observed significantly more often in malignant than in benign lesions. Studies have shown that the shape and texture of angiogenesis in CTLM images are significant characteristics to differentiate malignancy or benign lesions. A computer-aided diagnosis framework containing three main stages, volume of interest (VOI), feature extraction and classification, is used to enhance the performance of radiologist in the interpretation of CTLM images. 3D Fuzzy segmentation technique has been implemented to extract the VOI.

== Application ==
=== Image interpretation ===
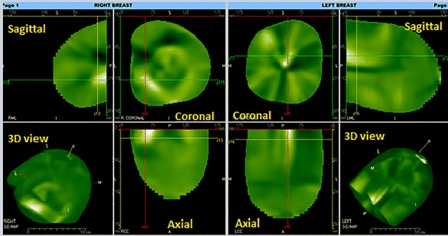

Three independent views are offered: the coronal, sagittal, and transverse views. These views can also form a composite 3D view. An inverse factor is applied to the image so that the high vasculature areas appear white on the image while the black or green areas are relatively avascular segments. The majority of benign lesions are not visualized due to a lack of increased absorption.

Two reconstruction modes are offered with CTLM: Front to Back Reconstruction and Maximal Intensity Projection. These two modes are used to evaluate the vascularization patterns to determine whether the images have normal or abnormal vascularization. Also, because tumor neovasculature is not limited to the tumor's anatomical border, CTLM will also reveal all recruited arteries and areas of increased circulation. This is an advantage to identify very small tumors.

=== Clinical trial ===
Dr. Eric Milne conducted a small localized study using CTLM as an adjunct to mammography; out of 122 cases, the number of biopsies required reduced from 89 to 47. Additionally, the sensitivity of CTLM is equal to mammography, but has much greater specificity.

=== Devices ===
Imaging Diagnostic Systems is a Florida-based company that has created a CTLM imaging device. In 2011 it was classified as a Class III medical device, and it is still undergoing approval.

== Comparison with other modalities ==
CTLM has uses a near infrared laser of wavelength ~808 nm which is not impeded by the dense breast tissue. The sensitivity of mammography, CTLM and mammography + CTLM was 34.4%, 74.4% and 81.57% respectively among extremely dense breasts and 68.29%, 85.00% and 95.34% respectively among heterogeneously dense breasts. The combination of CTLM and mammography is able to distinguish between benign and malignant tumors with higher accuracy.

=== Advantages ===
- It does not use ionizing radiation like in the case of mammography, SPECT.
- It has higher sensitivity and specificity for imaging dense breast tissue.
- It does not require contrast agent unlike MRI.
- Patient discomfort is minimized. No breast compression is required.
- It is easy and inexpensive to operate.

=== Disadvantages ===
- Radiologist requires specific skills to interpret and distinguish blood vessels in the CTLM images which is time-consuming and complicated due to various shape of angiogenesis.
- This technology is awaiting FDA approval.

== See also ==
- Diffuse optical imaging
- Near-infrared window in biological tissue
- Diffuse optical mammography
