= Fluorescence image-guided surgery =

- Specialty: Oncology (surgery)

Fluorescence guided surgery (FGS), also called fluorescence image-guided surgery, or in the specific case of tumor resection, fluorescence guided resection, is a medical imaging technique used to detect fluorescently labelled structures during surgery. Similarly to standard image-guided surgery, FGS has the purpose of guiding the surgical procedure and providing the surgeon with real time visualization of the operating field. When compared to other medical imaging modalities, FGS is cheaper and superior in terms of resolution and number of molecules detectable. As a drawback, penetration depth is usually very poor (100 μm) in the visible wavelengths, but it can reach up to 1–2 cm when excitation wavelengths in the near infrared are used.

== Imaging devices ==
FGS is performed using imaging devices with the purpose of providing real time simultaneous information from color reflectance images (bright field) and fluorescence emission. One or more light sources are used to excite and illuminate the sample. Light is collected using optical filters that match the emission spectrum of the fluorophore. Imaging lenses and digital cameras (CCD or CMOS) are used to produce the final image. Live video processing can also be performed to enhance contrast during fluorescence detection and improve signal-to-background ratio. In recent years a number of commercial companies have emerged to offer devices specializing in fluorescence in the NIR wavelengths, with the goal of capitalizing upon the growth in off label use of indocyanine green (ICG). However commercial systems with multiple fluorescence channels also exist commercially, for use with fluorescein and protoporphyrin IX (PpIX).

== Excitation sources ==
Fluorescence excitation is accomplished using various kind of light sources. Halogen lamps have the advantage of delivering high power for a relatively low cost. Using different band-pass filters, the same source can be used to produce several excitation channels from the UV to the near infrared. Light-emitting diodes (LEDs) have become very popular for low cost broad band illumination and narrow band excitation in FGS. Because of their characteristic light emission spectrum, a narrow range of wavelengths that matches the absorption spectrum of a given fluorophore can be selected without using a filter, further reducing the complexity of the optical system. Both halogen lamps and LEDs are suitable for white light illumination of the sample. Excitation can also be performed using laser diodes, particularly when high power over a short wavelength range (typically 5-10 nm) is needed. In this case the system has to account for the limits of exposure to laser radiation.

== Detection techniques ==
Live images from the fluorescent dye (typically protoporphyrin IX PPIX)and the surgical field are obtained using a combination of filters, lenses and cameras. During open surgery, hand held devices are usually preferred for their ease of use and mobility. A stand or arm can be used to maintain the system on top of the operating field, particularly when the weight and complexity of the device is high (e.g. when multiple cameras are used). The main disadvantage of such devices is that operating theater lights can interfere with the fluorescence emission channel, with a consequent decrease of signal-to-background ratio. This issue is usually solved by dimming or switching off the theater lights during fluorescence detection.

FGS can also be performed using minimally invasive devices such as laparoscopes or endoscopes. In this case, a system of filters, lenses and cameras is attached to the end of the probe. Unlike open surgery, the background from external light sources is reduced. Nevertheless, the excitation power density at the sample is limited by the low light transmission of the fiber optics in endoscopes and laparoscopes, particularly in the near infrared. Moreover, the ability of collecting light is much reduced compared to standard imaging lenses used for open surgery devices. FGS devices can also be implemented for robotic surgery (for example in the da Vinci Surgical System).

The fluorescence signal from tumor tissue is not very specific and includes autofluorescence from endogenous molecules. Thus, mass spectrometry as an analytical technique, which can specifically target individual molecules, is used as an orthogonal method to quantify the fluorophore in tissue. This is important to develop sensitive real-time monitoring in the operating theater.

== Clinical applications ==
The major limitation in FGS is the availability of clinically approved fluorescent dyes which have a novel biological indication. Indocyanine green (ICG) has been widely used as a non-specific agent to detect sentinel lymph nodes during surgery. ICG has the main advantage of absorbing and emitting light in the near infrared, allowing detection of nodes under several centimeters of tissue. Methylene blue can also be used for the same purpose, with an excitation peak in the red portion of the spectrum. First clinical applications using tumor-specific agents that detect deposits of ovarian cancer during surgery have been carried out.

== History ==
The first uses of FGS dates back to the 1940s when fluorescein was first used in humans to enhance the imaging of brain tumors, cysts, edema and blood flow in vivo. In modern times the use has fallen off, until a multicenter trial in Germany concluded that FGS to help guide glioma resection based upon fluorescence from PpIX provided significant short-term benefit.

== See also ==
- Endoscopy
- Fluorescence
- Image-guided surgery
- Laparoscopy
- Near infrared
- Near-infrared window in biological tissue
- Surgery
