= Photon diffusion equation =

Second order partial differential equation

Photon diffusion equation is a second order partial differential equation describing the time behavior of photon fluence rate distribution in a low-absorption high-scattering medium.

Its mathematical form is as follows. $\nabla(D(r)\cdot\nabla)\Phi(\vec{r},t)-v\mu_a(\vec{r})\Phi(\vec{r},t)+vS(\vec{r},t)=\frac{\partial\Phi(\vec{r},t)}{\partial t}$ where $\Phi$ is photon fluence rate (W/cm^{2}), $\nabla$ is del operator, $\mu_a$ is absorption coefficient (cm^{−1}), $D$ is diffusion constant, $v$ is the speed of light in the medium (m/s), and $S$ is an isotropic source term (W/cm^{3}).

Its main difference with diffusion equation in physics is that photon diffusion equation has an absorption term in it.

== Application ==
=== Medical Imaging ===
The properties of photon diffusion as explained by the equation is used in diffuse optical tomography.
