= Diffuse optical imaging =

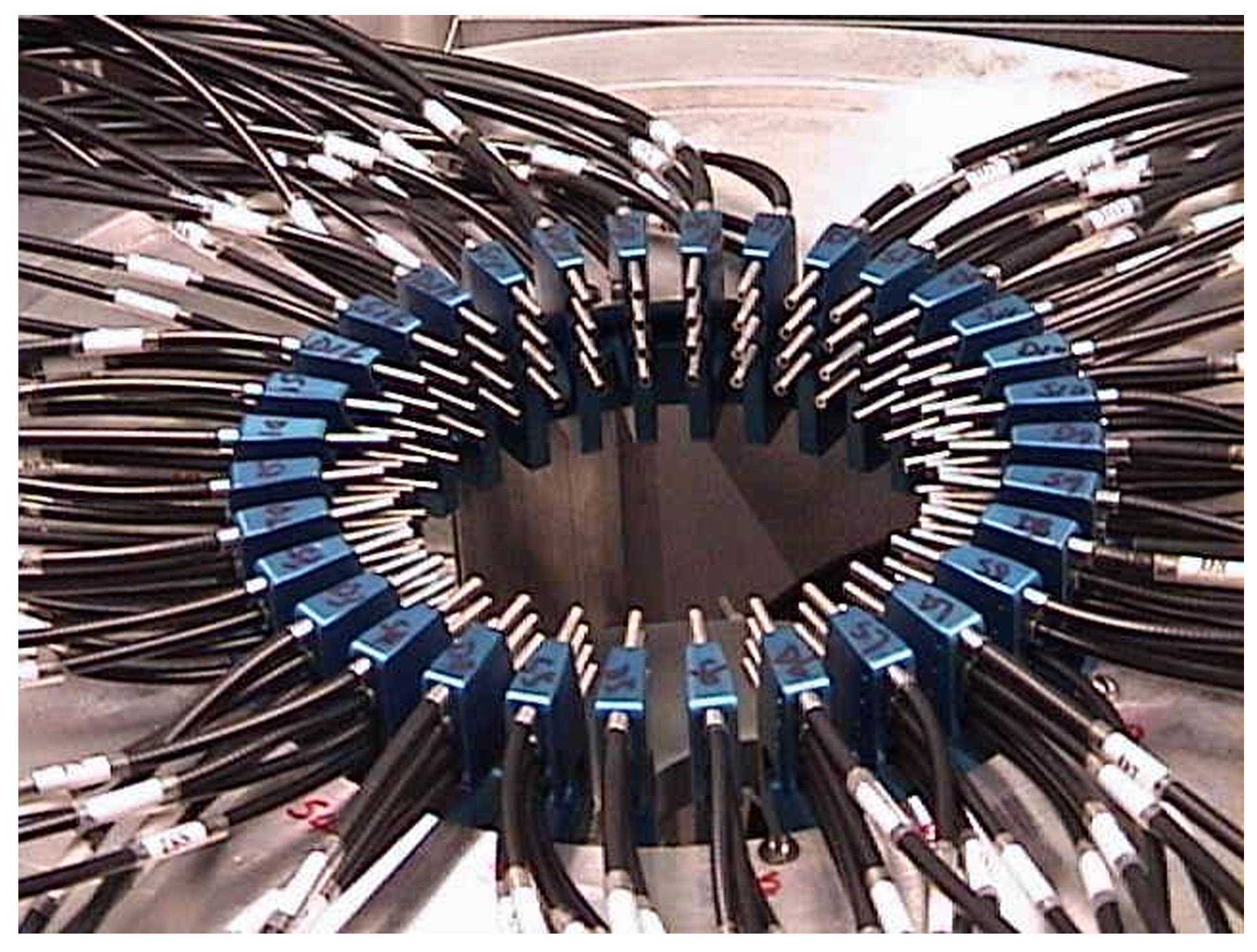
A fiber-optic array for breast cancer detection by way of diffuse optical tomography.

Diffuse optical imaging (DOI) is a method of imaging using near-infrared spectroscopy (NIRS) or fluorescence-based methods. When used to create 3D volumetric models of the imaged material DOI is referred to as diffuse optical tomography, whereas 2D imaging methods are classified as diffuse optical imaging.

The technique has many applications to neuroscience, sports medicine, wound monitoring, and cancer detection. Typically DOI techniques monitor changes in concentrations of oxygenated and deoxygenated hemoglobin and may additionally measure redox states of cytochromes. The technique may also be referred to as diffuse optical tomography (DOT), near infrared optical tomography (NIROT) or fluorescence diffuse optical tomography (FDOT), depending on the usage.

In neuroscience, functional measurements made using NIR wavelengths, DOI techniques may classify as functional near infrared spectroscopy fNIRS.

== Physical mechanism ==
Biological tissues can be considered strongly diffusive media, since during light propagation the scattering phenomenon is dominant over absorption in the so-called "therapeutic window" spectral range. Photon migration in diffusive media is described by the heuristic model of the diffusion equation, which offers analytical solutions for some specific geometries. Starting from the measured absorption and scattering coefficients, it is possible to derive the concentrations of tissues' main chromophores.

Diffuse optical imaging can be implemented in time domain, frequency domain or continuous wave, in reflectance or transmittance configuration.

== Limitations and Advances in Diffuse Optical Tomography ==
Although diffuse optical tomography (DOT) enables greater imaging depth—on the order of several centimeters—compared to other optical imaging techniques, it suffers from key limitations, including relatively low spatial resolution and slow image acquisition and reconstruction times

To overcome these limitations, a number of improvements have been proposed across the imaging pipeline. These include advances in acquisition strategies, signal processing techniques, and reconstruction algorithms.

=== Confocal Time-of-Flight Diffuse Optical Tomography ===
Conventional DOT suffers from image degradation due to the highly scattering nature of biological tissues, which leads to poor contrast and depth localization. Confocal Time-of-Flight Diffuse Optical Tomography (TOF-DOT) addresses this by using time-gated detection to selectively collect early-arriving photons that have taken more direct paths through tissue. This reduces the influence of multiply scattered photons and improves the signal-to-noise ratio.

The TOF-DOT method thereby enhances image resolution and contrast, offering improved clarity in reconstructed images. Both simulations and experimental studies on tissue phantoms have demonstrated superior imaging performance compared to traditional DOT methods. However, this technique has yet to be validated in vivo.

== See also ==
- Optical tomography
- Computed tomography laser mammography
- Diffuse optical mammography
- Diffusive optical imaging in neuroscience
- Near-infrared window in biological tissue
- Radiative transfer equation and diffusion theory for photon transport in biological tissue
- Time-domain diffuse optics
