= Transdermal optical imaging =

Method of detecting blood flow in face

Transdermal optical imaging, also known as transdermal optical imagery or TOI, is a method of detecting blood flow of the face by measuring hemoglobin concentration using a digital video camera. Because of the translucent property of skin, light can travel beneath the skin and re-emit. The re-emitted light from underneath the skin is affected by chromophores, mainly hemoglobin and melanin, which differ in color. The color difference allows TOI machine learning software to separate the images into layers, which are known as bitplanes. It extracts signals rich in hemoglobin and signals rich in melanin, then discards the melanin-rich signals to obtain a recording of hemoglobin changes under the skin. Transdermal optical imaging has been proposed as an alternative to cuff-based methods of measuring blood pressure because it is able to measure heart rate accurately in a "contactless and non-invasive" way. Transdermal optical imaging may be able to detect hidden emotions using the patterns of blood flow in the face.
