= Functional near-infrared spectroscopy =

Optical technique for monitoring brain activity

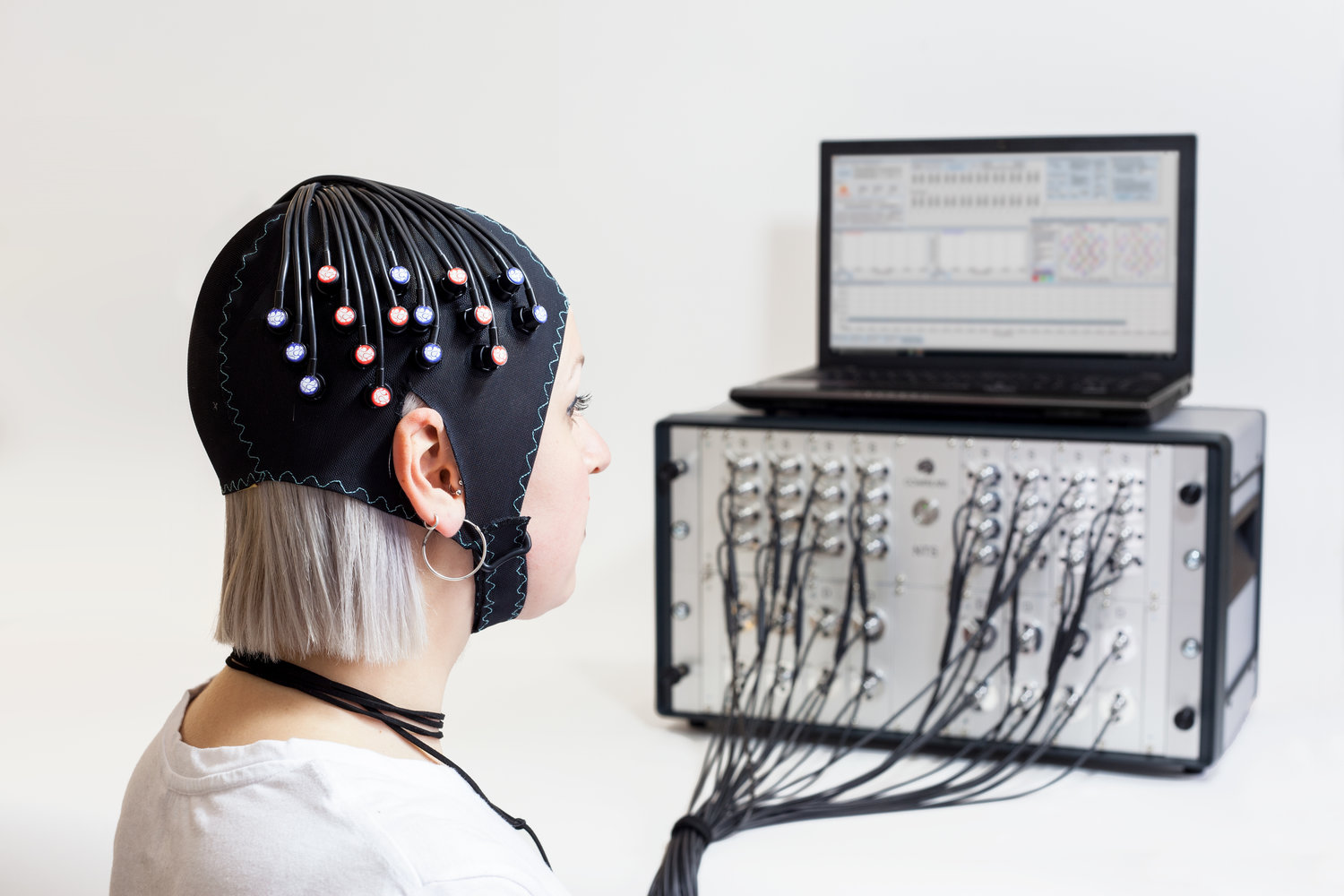
fNIRS with a Gowerlabs NTS system

Functional near-infrared spectroscopy (fNIRS), sometimes referred to as NIRS or Optical Topography (OT), is an optical brain monitoring technique which uses near-infrared spectroscopy for the purpose of functional neuroimaging. Using fNIRS, brain activity is measured by using near-infrared light to estimate cortical hemodynamic activity that occurs in response to neural activity. The use of fNIRS has led to advances in different fields such as cognitive neuroscience, clinical applications, developmental science and sport and exercise science. The signal is often compared with the BOLD signal measured by fMRI and is capable of measuring changes both in oxy- and deoxyhemoglobin concentration, but can only measure from regions near the cortical surface.

== Works ==
Basic functional near infrared spectroscopy (fNIRS) abbreviations
BFi = blood flow index

CBF = cerebral blood flow

CBV = cerebral blood volume

CMRO_{2}= metabolic rate of oxygen

CW= continuous wave

DCS = diffuse correlation spectroscopy

FD = frequency-domain

Hb, HbR= deoxygenated hemoglobin

HbO, HbO_{2}= oxygenated hemoglobin

HbT= total hemoglobin concentration

HGB = blood hemoglobin

SaO_{2}= arterial saturation

SO_{2}= hemoglobin saturation

SvO_{2}= venous saturation

TD=time-domain

fNIRS estimates the concentration of hemoglobin from changes in absorption of near infrared light. As light moves or propagates through the head, it is alternately scattered or absorbed by the tissue through which it travels. Because hemoglobin is a significant absorber of near-infrared light, changes in absorbed light can be used to reliably measure changes in hemoglobin concentration. Different fNIRS techniques can also use the way in which light propagates to estimate blood volume and oxygenation. The technique is safe, non-invasive, and can be used with other imaging modalities.

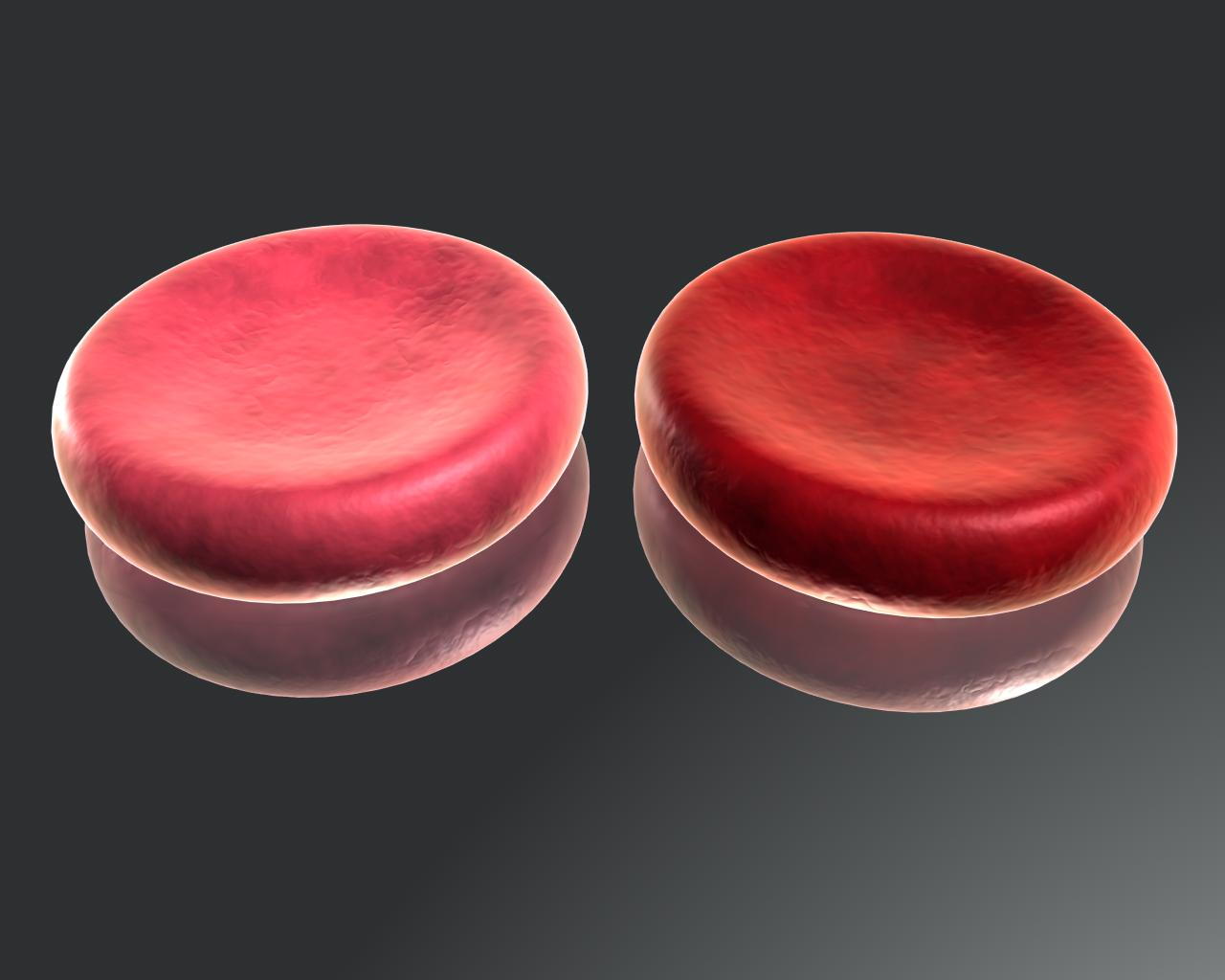
Oxygenated and deoxygenated hemoglobin

fNIRS is a non-invasive imaging method involving the quantification of chromophore concentration resolved from the measurement of near infrared (NIR) light attenuation or temporal or phasic changes. The technique takes advantage of the optical window in which (a) skin, tissue, and bone are mostly transparent to NIR light (700–900 nm spectral interval) and (b) hemoglobin (Hb) and deoxygenated-hemoglobin (deoxy-Hb) are strong absorbers of light.

Absorption spectra for oxy-Hb and deoxy-Hb for near-infrared wavelengths

There are different ways for infrared light to interact with the brain tissue. fNIRS focuses primarily on absorption: differences in the absorption spectra of deoxy-Hb and oxy-Hb allow the measurement of relative changes in hemoglobin concentration through the use of light attenuation at multiple wavelengths. Two or more wavelengths are selected, with one wavelength above and one below the isosbestic point of 810 nm—at which deoxy-Hb and oxy-Hb have identical absorption coefficients. Using the modified Beer-Lambert law (mBLL), relative changes in concentration can be calculated as a function of total photon path length.

Typically, the light emitter and detector are placed ipsilaterally (each emitter/detector pair on the same side) on the subject's skull so recorded measurements are due to back-scattered (reflected) light following elliptical pathways. fNIRS is most sensitive to hemodynamic changes which occur nearest to the scalp and these superficial artifacts are often addressed using additional light detectors located closer to the light source (short-separation detectors).

=== Modified Beer–Lambert law ===
Changes in light intensity can be related to changes in relative concentrations of hemoglobin through the modified Beer–Lambert law (mBLL). The Beer Lambert-law has to deal with concentration of hemoglobin. This technique also measures relative changes in light attenuation as well as using mBLL to quantify hemoglobin concentration changes.

== Equipment and Software ==
=== fNIRS cap ===
10-20 system

fNIRS electrode locations can be defined using a variety of layouts, including names and locations that are specified by the International 10–20 system as well as other layouts that are specifically optimized to maintain a consistent 30mm distance between each location. In addition to the standard positions of electrodes, short separation channels can be added. Short separation channels allow the measurement of scalp signals. Since the short separation channels measure the signal coming from the scalp, they allow the removal of the signal of superficial layers. This leaves behind the actual brain response. Short separation channel detectors are usually placed 8mm away from a source. They do not need to be in a specific direction or in the same direction as a detector.

=== Software ===
==== HOMER3 ====
HOMER3 allows users to obtain estimates and maps of brain activation. It is a set of matlab scripts used for analyzing fNIRS data. This set of scripts has evolved since the early 1990s first as the Photon Migration Imaging toolbox, then HOMER1 and HOMER2, and now HOMER3.

==== NIRS toolbox ====
This toolbox is a set of Matlab-based tools for the analysis of functional near-infrared spectroscopy (fNIRS). This toolbox defines the +nirs namespace and includes a series of tools for signal processing, display, and statistics of fNIRS data. This toolbox is built around an object-oriented framework of Matlab classes and namespaces.

==== AtlasViewer ====
AtlasViewer allows fNIRS data to be visualized on a model of the brain. In addition, it also allows the user to design probes which can eventually be placed onto a subject.

== History ==
The conceptual origins of functional near-infrared spectroscopy date to 1977, when Frans Jöbsis demonstrated that near-infrared light could penetrate biological tissue and report on oxygenation changes in vivo. Throughout the 1980s, this observation informed early cerebral oximetry instruments used in neonatal medicine and physiology research. In the early 1990s, several research groups independently reported changes in hemoglobin concentrations during cognitive tasks, establishing fNIRS as a viable functional neuroimaging modality. Progress occurred internationally: researchers in Japan, Europe, and North America contributed to theory, hardware, and methodological refinement. The term “optical topography” was introduced in 1995 when Hitachi released one of the first practical multi-channel commercial systems. With rising sensor density, signal analysis advances, and portable configurations, fNIRS expanded rapidly into cognitive neuroscience, clinical medicine, developmental psychology, and applied research.

== Diffuse Optical Spectroscopy/Imaging (DOI/DOS) ==
=== Spectroscopic techniques ===
==== Continuous wave ====
Continuous wave (CW) system uses light sources with constant frequency and amplitude. In fact, to measure absolute changes in HbO concentration with the mBLL, we need to know photon path-length. However, CW-fNIRS does not provide any knowledge of photon path-length, so changes in HbO concentration are relative to an unknown path-length. Many CW-fNIRS commercial systems use estimations of photon path-length derived from computerized Monte-Carlo simulations and physical models, to approximate absolute quantification of hemoglobin concentrations.

$\text{OD} = \operatorname{ln}(I_{0}/I)=\epsilon\cdot [X]\cdot l \cdot \text{DPF} + G$

Where $\text{OD}$ is the optical density or attenuation, $I_0$ is emitted light intensity, $I$ is measured light intensity, $\epsilon$ is the attenuation coefficient, $[X]$ is the chromophore concentration, $l$ is the distance between source and detector and $\text{DPF}$ is the differential path length factor, and $G$ is a geometric factor associated with scattering.

When the attenuation coefficients $\epsilon$ are known, constant scattering loss is assumed, and the measurements are treated differentially in time, the equation reduces to:

$\Delta[X]=\Delta \frac{\text{OD} }{\epsilon d}$

Where $d$ is the total corrected photon path-length.

Using a dual wavelength system, measurements for HbO_{2} and Hb can be solved from the matrix equation:

$$\begin{pmatrix}
\Delta \text{OD}_{\lambda_{1}} \\
\Delta \text{OD}_{\lambda_{2}}
\end{pmatrix} =
\begin{pmatrix}
\epsilon^{\text{Hb}}_{\lambda_{1}}d & \epsilon^{\text{HbO}_2}_{\lambda_{1}}d \\
\epsilon^{\text{Hb}}_{\lambda_{2}}d & \epsilon^{\text{HbO}_2}_{\lambda_{2}}d
\end{pmatrix}
\begin{pmatrix}
\Delta [X]^{\text{Hb}} \\
\Delta [X]^{\text{HbO}_2}
\end{pmatrix}$$

Due to their simplicity and cost-effectiveness, CW-fNIRS is by far the most common form of functional NIRS since it is the cheapest to make, applicable with more channels, and ensures a high temporal resolution. However, it does not distinguish between absorption and scattering changes, and cannot measure absolute absorption values: which means that it is only sensitive to relative change in HbO concentration.

Still, the simplicity and cost-effectiveness of CW-based devices prove themselves to be the most favorable for a number of clinical applications: neonatal care, patient monitoring systems, diffuse optical tomography, and so forth. Moreover, thanks to its portability, wireless CW systems have been developed—allowing individuals to be monitored in ambulatory, clinical and sports environments.

==== Frequency domain ====
Frequency domain (FD) system comprises NIR laser sources which provide an amplitude-modulated sinusoid at frequencies near 100 MHz. FD-fNIRS measures attenuation, phase shift and the average path length of light through the tissue.

Changes in the back-scattered signal's amplitude and phase provide a direct measurement of absorption and scattering coefficients of the tissue, thus obviating the need for information about photon path-length; and from the coefficients we determine the changes in the concentration of hemodynamic parameters.

Because of the need for modulated lasers as well as phasic measurements, FD system-based devices are more technically complex (therefore more expensive and much less portable) than CW-based ones. However, the system is capable of providing absolute concentrations of HbO and HbR.

==== Time domain ====
Time domain (TD) system introduces a short NIR pulse with a pulse length usually in the order of picoseconds—around 70 ps. Through time-of-flight measurements, photon path-length may be directly observed by dividing resolved time by the speed of light. Information about hemodynamic changes can be found in the attenuation, decay, and time profile of the back-scattered signal. For this photon-counting technology is introduced, which counts 1 photon for every 100 pulses to maintain linearity. TD-fNIRS does have a slow sampling rate as well as a limited number of wavelengths. Because of the need for a photon-counting device, high-speed detection, and high-speed emitters, time-resolved methods are the most expensive and technically complicated.

TD-based devices have the highest depth sensitivity and are capable of presenting most accurate values of baseline hemoglobin concentration and oxygenation.

=== Diffuse correlation spectroscopy ===
Diffuse correlation spectroscopy (DCS) is a non-invasive optical imaging technique that utilizes coherent near-infrared light to measure local microvascular cerebral blood flow by quantifying the temporal light intensity fluctuations generated by dynamic scattering of moving red blood cells. This dynamic scattering from moving cells causes the detected intensity to temporally fluctuate. These fluctuations can be quantified by the temporal intensity autocorrelation curve of a single speckle. The decay of the autocorrelation curve is fitted with the solution of the correlation diffusion equation to obtain an index of cerebral blood flow.

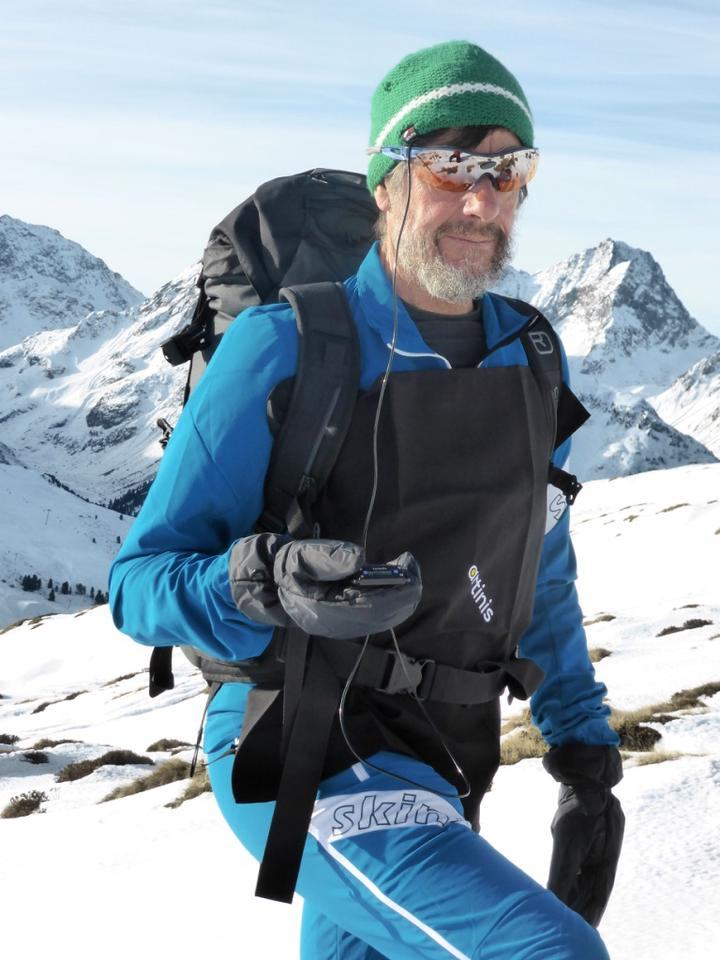
Measurement of brain oxyhemoglobin and deoxyhemoglobin concentration changes at high alltitude induced hypoxia with a portable fNIRS device (PortaLite, Artinis Medical Systems)

== Application ==
fNIRS has been successfully implemented as a control signal for brain–computer interface systems. Modern fNIRS systems are combined with virtual or augmented reality in studies on brain-computer interfaces, neurorehabilitation or social perception. fNIRS can be used to monitor musicians' brain activity while playing musical instruments. fNIRS is compatible with some other neuroimaging modalities, including: MRI, EEG, and MEG. fNIRS has also been used to measure the effects of transcranial magnetic stimulation (TMS).

=== Hypoxia & altitude studies ===
Because the body requires oxygen, it has developed mechanisms to detect oxygen levels and activate responses to hypoxia. Understanding the physiological mechanisms underlying the response to oxygen deprivation is important, and NIRS devices are used in this field of research.

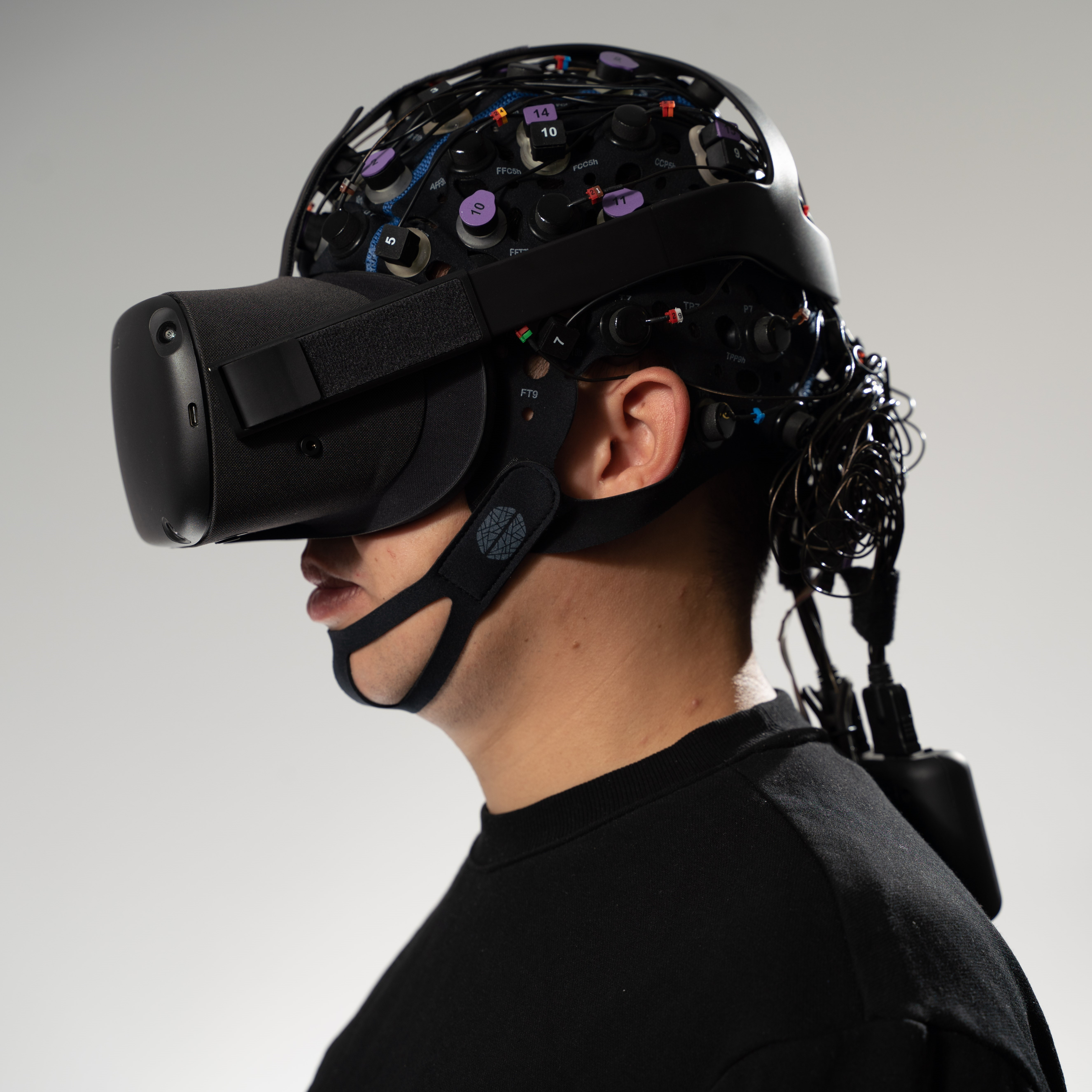
Mobile and wireless fNIRS and EEG systems synchronized with all-in-one head mounted display (PhotonCap, Cortivision)

== Brain mapping ==
=== Functional connectivity ===
fNIRS measurements can be used to calculate a limited degree of functional connectivity. Multi-channel fNIRS measurements create a topographical map of neural activation, whereby temporal correlation between spatially separated events can be analyzed. Functional connectivity is typically assessed in terms correlations between the hemodynamic responses of spatially distinct regions of interest (ROIs). In brain studies, functional connectivity measurements are commonly taken for resting state patient data, as well as data recorded over stimulus paradigms. A study led by Alessandro Crimi team highlighted that the functional connectivity measures obtained with fNIRS measurements are quite different from those obtained via EEG caps.

=== Cerebral oximetry ===
NIRS monitoring is helpful in a number of ways. Preterm infants can be monitored reducing cerebral hypoxia and hyperoxia with different patterns of activities. It is an effective aid in Cardiopulmonary bypass, is strongly considered to improve patient outcomes and reduce costs and extended stays.

There are inconclusive results for use of NIRS with patients with traumatic brain injury, so it has been concluded that it should remain a research tool.

=== Diffuse optical tomography ===
Diffuse optical tomography is the 3D version of Diffuse optical imaging. Diffuse optical images are obtained using NIRS or fluorescence-based methods. These images can be used to develop a 3D volumetric model which is known as the Diffuse Optical Tomography.

=== Functional neuroimaging ===
The use of fNIRS as a functional neuroimaging method relies on the principle of neuro-vascular coupling also known as the haemodynamic response or blood-oxygen-level dependent (BOLD) response. This principle also forms the core of fMRI techniques. Through neuro-vascular coupling, neuronal activity is linked to related changes in localized cerebral blood flow. fNIRS and fMRI are sensitive to similar physiologic changes and are often comparative methods. Studies relating fMRI and fNIRS show highly correlated results in cognitive tasks. fNIRS has several advantages in cost and portability over fMRI, but cannot be used to measure cortical activity more than 4 cm deep due to limitations in light emitter power and has more limited spatial resolution. fNIRS includes the use of diffuse optical tomography (DOT/NIRDOT) for functional purposes. Multiplexing fNIRS channels can allow 2D topographic functional maps of brain activity (e.g. with Hitachi ETG-4000, Artinis Oxymon, NIRx NIRScout, etc.) while using multiple emitter spacings may be used to build 3D tomographic maps.

fNIRS hyperscanning with two violinists

=== Hyperscanning ===
Hyperscanning involves two or more brains monitored simultaneously to investigate interpersonal (across-brains) neural correlates in various social situations, which proves fNIRS to be a suitable modality for investigating live brain-to-brain social interactions.

== Advantages and Limitations ==
=== Advantages ===
The advantages of fNIRS are, among other things: noninvasiveness, low-cost modalities, perfect safety, high temporal resolution, compatibility with other imaging modalities, and multiple hemodynamic biomarkers. People who use medical implants in their brains such as cochlear implant, or metal brain plates are able to wear fNIRs with no risk of device displacement or heating, which can occur in MRI.

=== Limitations ===
fNIRs have low brain sensitivity due to it only being able to detect changes on the cortical surface and low spatial resolution, about 1-3 centimeters deep. The signal is sensitive to hair and skin pigment differences, making it difficult to do between-subject designs. Dense or extremely curly hair may prohibit placement of optodes close to the scalp, limiting the ability to use the technique with all individuals. Although this device can be used with brain implant users, the signal over these areas will be disrupted meaning that spatial oversampling must occur to retain spatial resolution of the target area. Alternative strategies must be implemented such as more pressure on optodes, or specific montages in order to compensate for these limitations.

== See also ==
- Near-infrared spectroscopy
- Diffuse optical tomography
- Functional neuroimaging
- Cognitive neuroscience
- The Society for Functional Near Infrared Society (external link)
- Global fNIRS (external Link)
- An example of a mobile fNIRS system designed for studies in VR environments
- Soterix Medical fNIRS
- Cortech Solutions fNIRS
- Neural synchrony
