= Optical tomography =

Medical imaging technique

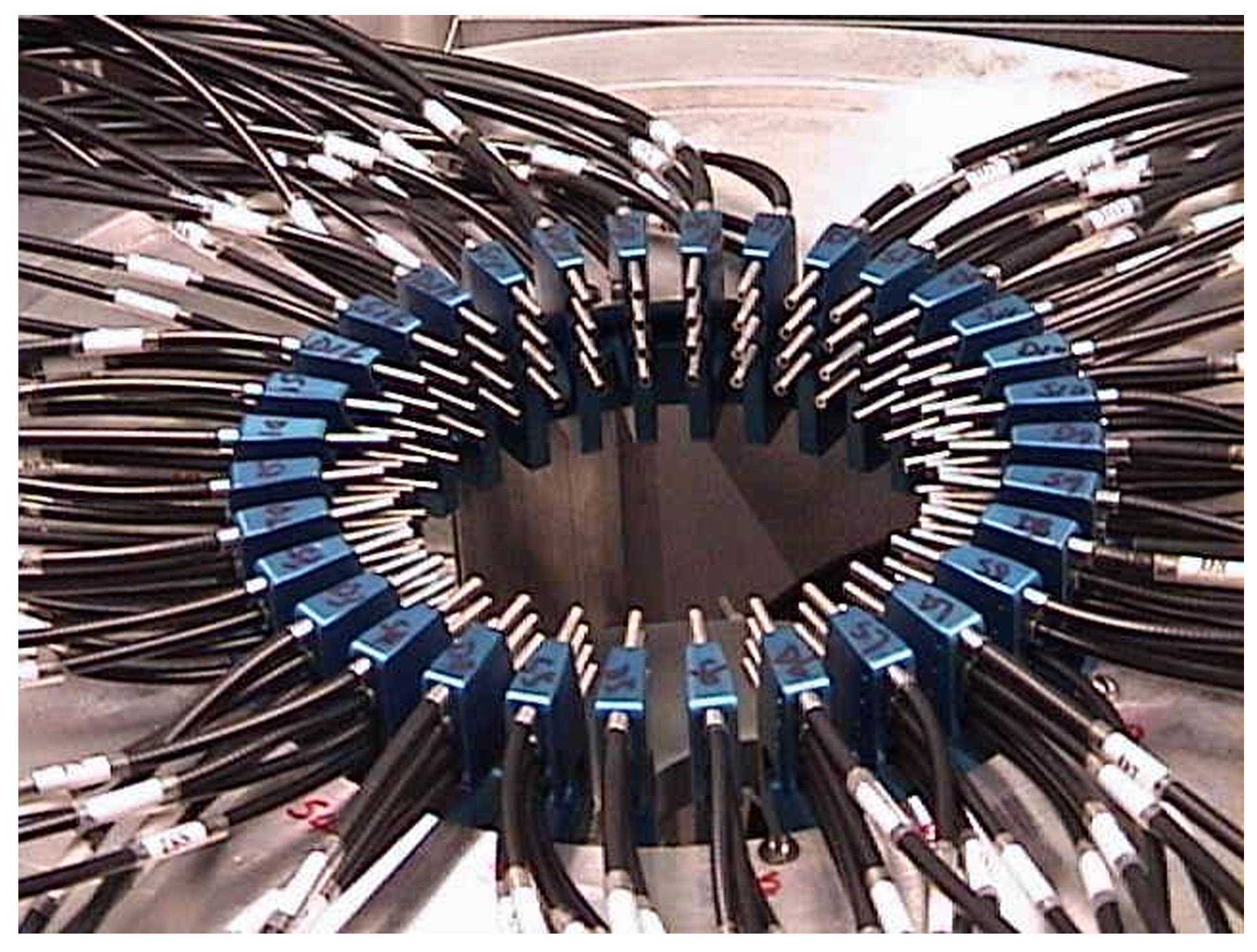
- A fiber-optic array for breast cancer detection by way of Diffuse Optical Tomography.
- MeSH: D041622

Optical tomography is a form of computed tomography that creates a digital volumetric model of an object by reconstructing images made from light transmitted and scattered through an object. Optical tomography is used mostly in medical imaging research. Optical tomography in industry is used as a sensor of thickness and internal structure of semiconductors.

== Principle ==
Optical tomography relies on the object under study being at least partially light-transmitting or translucent, so it works best on soft tissue, such as breast and brain tissue.

The high scatter-based attenuation involved is generally dealt with by using intense, often pulsed or intensity-modulated, light sources, and highly sensitive light sensors, and the use of infrared light at frequencies where body tissues are most transmissive. Soft tissues are highly scattering but weakly absorbing in the near-infrared and red parts of the spectrum, so that this is the wavelength range usually used.

== Types ==
=== Diffuse optical tomography ===
In near-infrared diffuse optical tomography (DOT), transmitted diffuse photons are collected and a diffusion equation is used to reconstruct an image from them.

=== Time-of-flight diffuse optical tomography ===
A variant of optical tomography uses optical time-of-flight sampling as an attempt to distinguish transmitted light from scattered light. This concept has been used in several academic and commercial systems for breast-cancer imaging and cerebral measurement. The key to separation of absorption from scatter is the use of either time-resolved or frequency-domain data, which is then matched with a diffusion-theory-based estimate of how the light propagated through the tissue. The measurement of time of flight or frequency-domain phase shift is essential to allow separation of absorption from scatter with reasonable accuracy.

=== Fluorescence molecular tomography ===
In fluorescence molecular tomography, the fluorescence signal transmitted through the tissue is normalized by the excitation signal transmitted through the tissue, so many of the fluorescence tomography systems do not require the use of time-resolved or frequency-domain data, although research is still ongoing in this area. Since the applications of fluorescent molecules in humans are fairly limited, most of the work in fluorescence tomography has been in the realm of pre-clinical cancer research. Both commercial systems and academic research have been shown to be effective in tracking tumor protein expression and production, and tracking response to therapies.

=== Confocal diffuse tomography ===
Confocal diffuse tomography uses a powerful laser to illuminate a sample through a scattering medium, followed by deconvolution with a calibrated diffusion operator to estimate a volume without the effects of diffusive scattering and subsequent application of a confocal inverse filter to recover the sample image.

=== Confocal time-of-flight diffuse optical tomography ===
Confocal time-of-flight diffuse optical tomography combines concepts from both time-of-flight and confocal diffuse optical tomography (DOT).

== See also ==
- Optical coherence tomography
- Diffuse optical imaging
- Computed tomography laser mammography
