= Near-infrared window in biological tissue =

Range of wavelengths from 650 to 1350 nanometre

The near-infrared (NIR) window (also known as optical window or therapeutic window) defines the range of wavelengths from 650 to 1350 nanometre (nm) where light has its maximum depth of penetration in tissue. Within the NIR window, scattering is the most dominant light-tissue interaction, and therefore the propagating light becomes diffused rapidly. Since scattering increases the distance travelled by photons within tissue, the probability of photon absorption also increases. The NIR window is primarily limited by the light absorption of blood at short wavelengths and water at long wavelengths. The technique using this window is called NIRS. Medical imaging techniques such as fluorescence image-guided surgery often make use of the NIR window to detect deep structures.

== Absorption properties of tissue components ==
The absorption coefficient ($\mu_{a}$) is defined as the probability of photon absorption in tissue per unit path length. Different tissue components have different $\mu_a$ values. Moreover, $\mu_a$ is a function of wavelength. Discussed below are the absorption properties of the most important chromophores in tissue. The molar extinction coefficient ($\varepsilon \,$) is another parameter that is used to describe photon absorption in tissue. By multiplying $\varepsilon \,$ by the molar concentration and by ln(10), one can convert $\varepsilon \,$ to $\mu_a \,$.

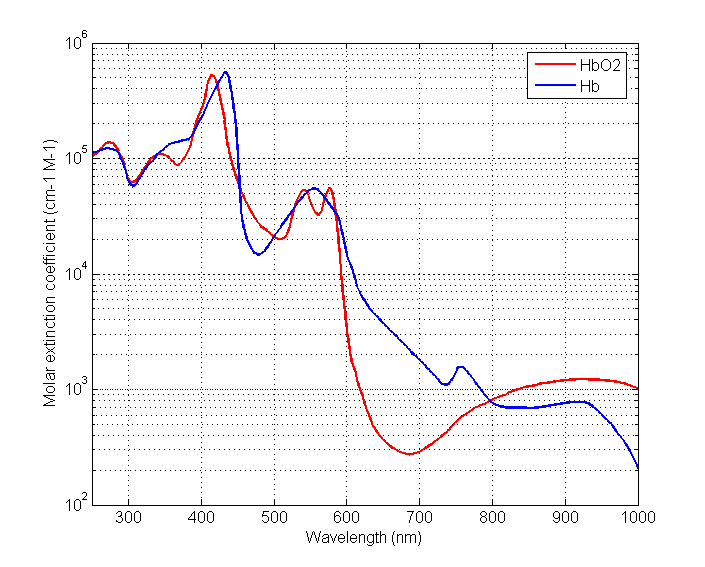
Figure 1: The molar extinction coefficients of HbO2 and Hb.

=== Blood ===
Blood consists of two different types of hemoglobin: oxyhemoglobin ($HbO_2$) is bound to oxygen, while deoxyhemoglobin ($Hb$) is unbound to oxygen. These two different types of hemoglobin exhibit different absorption spectra that are normally represented in terms of molar extinction coefficients, as shown in Figure 1. The molar extinction coefficient of Hb has its highest absorption peak at 420 nm and a second peak at 580 nm. Its spectrum then gradually decreases as light wavelength increases. On the other hand, $HbO2$ shows its highest absorption peak at 410 nm, and two secondary peaks at 550 nm and 600 nm. As light wavelengths passes 600 nm, $HbO_2$ absorption decays much faster than Hb absorption. The points where the molar extinction coefficient spectra of $Hb$ and $HbO_2$ intersect are called isosbestic points.

By using two different wavelengths, it is possible to calculate the concentrations of oxyhemoglobin ($C_{HbO2}$) and deoxyhemoglobin ($C_{Hb}$) as shown in the following equations:

$$\mu_a(\lambda_1) = \ln(10)\varepsilon_{HbO2}(\lambda_1)C_{HbO2}+\ln(10)\varepsilon_{Hb}(\lambda_1)C_{Hb} \,$$

$$\mu_a(\lambda_2) = \ln(10)\varepsilon_{HbO2}(\lambda_2)C_{HbO2}+\ln(10)\varepsilon_{Hb}(\lambda_2)C_{Hb} \,$$

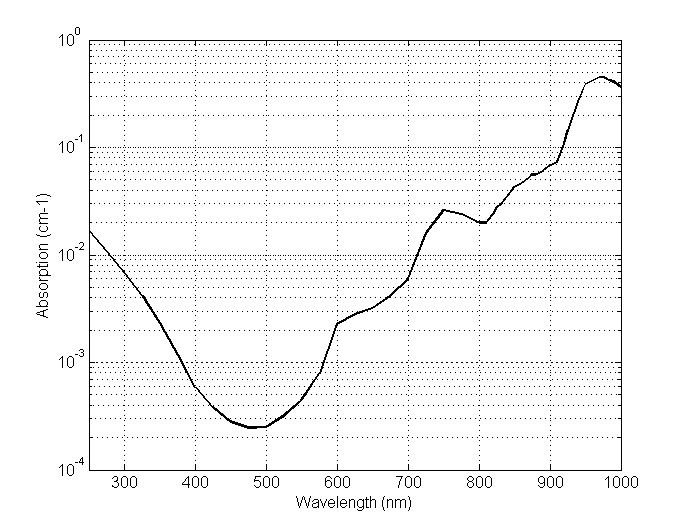
Figure 2: The absorption spectrum of water.

Here, $\lambda_1$ and $\lambda_2$ are the two wavelengths; $\varepsilon_{HbO2}$ and $\varepsilon_{Hb}$ are the molar extinction coefficients of $HbO_2$ and $Hb$, respectively; $C_{HbO2}$ and $C_{Hb}$ are the molar concentrations of $HbO_2$ and $Hb$ in tissue, respectively. Oxygen saturation ($SO_2$) can then be computed as

$$SO_2=\frac {C_{HbO2}} {C_{Hb} + C_{HbO2}}$$

=== Water ===
Although water is nearly transparent in the range of visible light, it becomes absorbing over the near-infrared region. Water is a critical component since its concentration is high in human tissue. The absorption spectrum of water in the range from 250 to 1000 nm is shown in Figure 2. Although absorption is rather low in this spectral range, it still contributes to the overall attenuation of tissue.

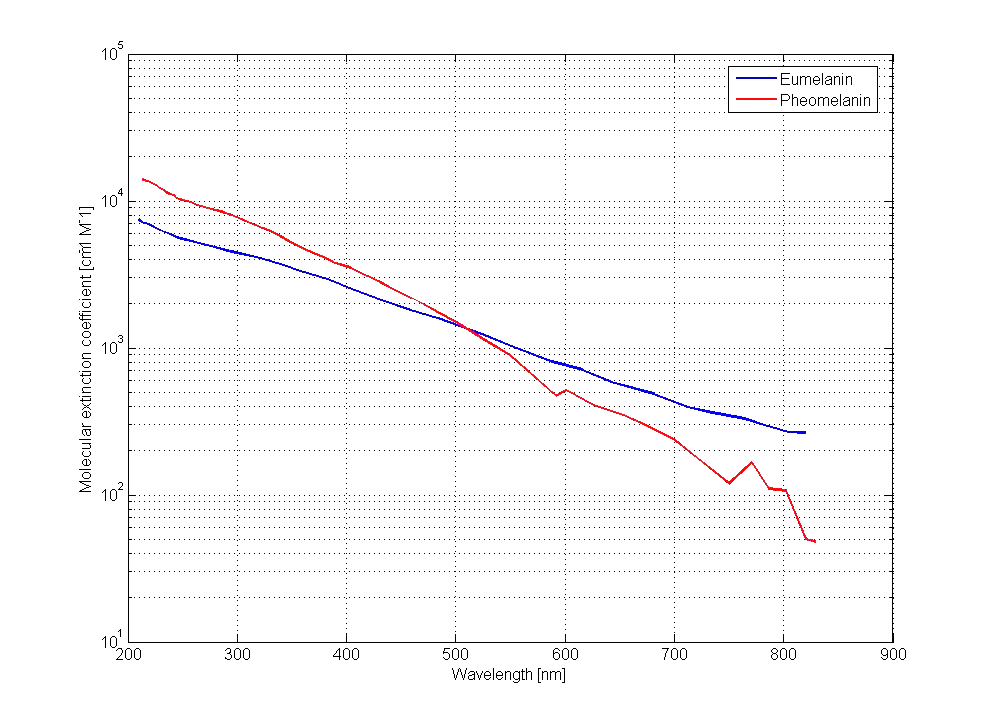
Figure 3: The molar extinction coefficients of eumelanin and pheomelanin.

Other tissue components with less significant contributions to the total absorption spectrum of tissue are melanin and fat.

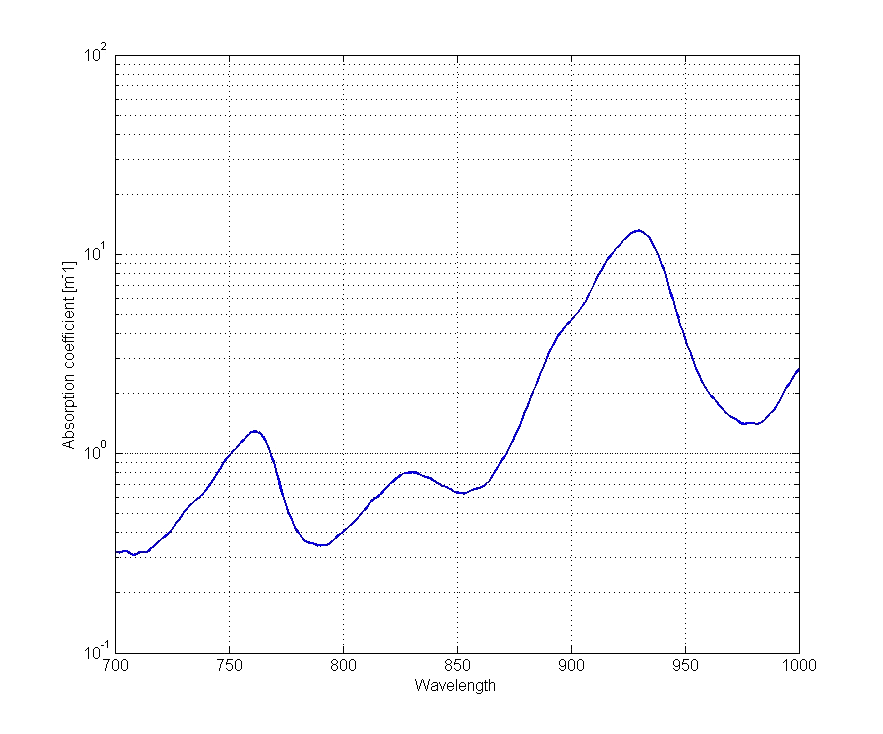
Figure 4: The absorption coefficient spectrum of fat.

=== Melanin ===
Melanin is a chromophore that exists in the human epidermal layer of skin responsible for protection from harmful UV radiation. When melanocytes are stimulated by solar radiation, melanin is produced. Melanin is one of the major absorbers of light in some biological tissue (although its contribution is smaller than other components). There are two types of melanin: eumelanin which is black-brown and pheomelanin which is red-yellow. The molar extinction coefficient spectra corresponding to both types are shown in Figure 3.

=== Fat ===
Fat is one of the major components in tissue that can comprise 10–40% of tissue. Although not many mammalian fat spectra are available, Figure 4 shows an example extracted from pig fat.

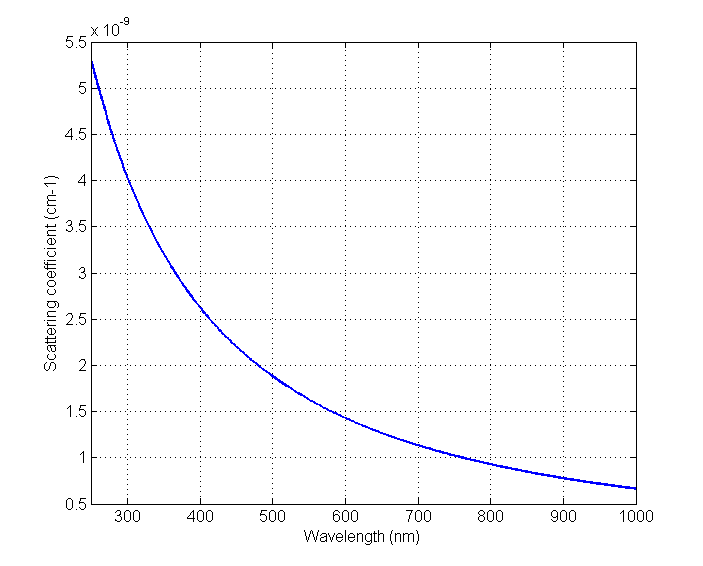
Figure 5: The scattering coefficient spectrum of biological tissue.

== Scattering properties of tissue components ==
Optical scattering occurs due to mismatches in refractive index of the different tissue components, ranging from cell membranes to whole cells. Cell nuclei and mitochondria are the most important scatterers. Their dimensions range from 100 nm to 6 μm, and thus fall within the NIR window. Most of these organelles fall in the Mie scattering regime, and exhibit highly anisotropic forward-directed scattering.

Light scattering in biological tissue is denoted by the scattering coefficient ($\mu_s$), which is defined as the probability of photon scattering in tissue per unit path length. Figure 5 shows a plot of the scattering spectrum.

When pressure is applied to the tissue, the attenuation coefficient (mainly the scattering coefficient) is modified due to changes in refractive index mismatches

== Effective attenuation coefficient ==
Attenuation of light in deep biological tissue depends on the effective attenuation coefficient ($\mu_{eff}$), which is defined as

$$\mu_{\text{eff}}=\sqrt{3\mu_a(\mu_a+\mu'_s)}$$

where $\mu'_s$ is the transport scattering coefficient defined as

$$\mu'_\text{s}=\mu_s (1-g) \,$$

where $g$ is the anisotropy of biological tissue, which has a representative value of 0.9. Figure 5 shows a plot of transport scattering coefficient spectrum in breast tissue, which has a wavelength dependence of $\lambda \,^{-0.7}$. The effective attenuation coefficient is the dominant factor for determining light attenuation at depth $d$ ≫ 1/ $\mu_{\text{eff}}$.

== Estimation ==
The NIR window can be computed based on the absorption coefficient spectrum or the effective attenuation coefficient spectrum. A possible criterion for selecting the NIR window is given by the FWHM of the inverse of these spectra as shown in Figure 7.

In addition to the total concentration of hemoglobin, the oxygen saturation will define the concentration of oxy- and deoxyhemoglobin in tissue and so the total absorption spectrum. Depending on the type of tissue, we can consider different situations. Below, the total concentration of hemoglobin is assumed to be 2.3 mM.

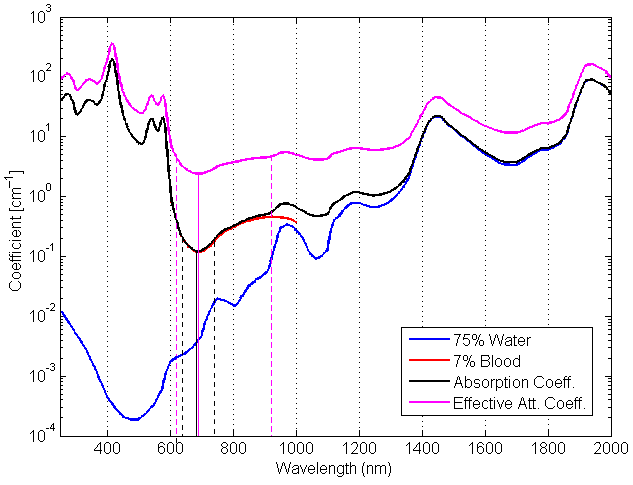
Figure 6 (a): Spectra for arteries (SaO_{2} ≈ 98%).

Absorption coefficient: λ_{min} = 686 nm; NIR window = (634–756) nm.

Effective attenuation coefficient: λ_{min} = 690 nm; NIR window = (618–926) nm.

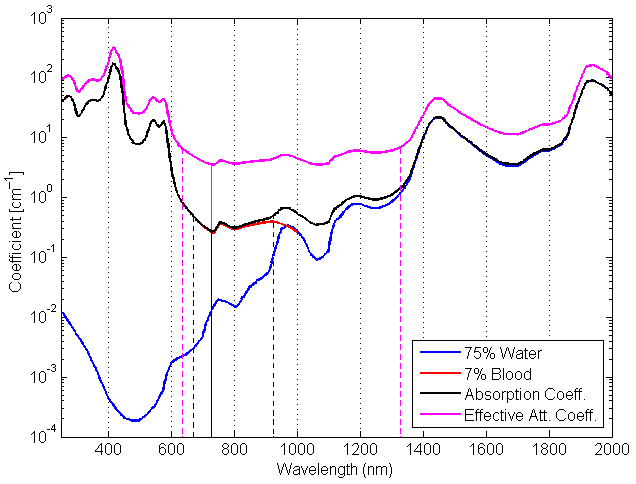
Figure 6 (b): Spectra for veins (SvO_{2} ≈ 60%).

Absorption coefficient: λ_{min} = 730 nm; NIR window = (664–932) nm.

Effective attenuation coefficient: λ_{min} = 730 nm; NIR window = (630–1328) nm.

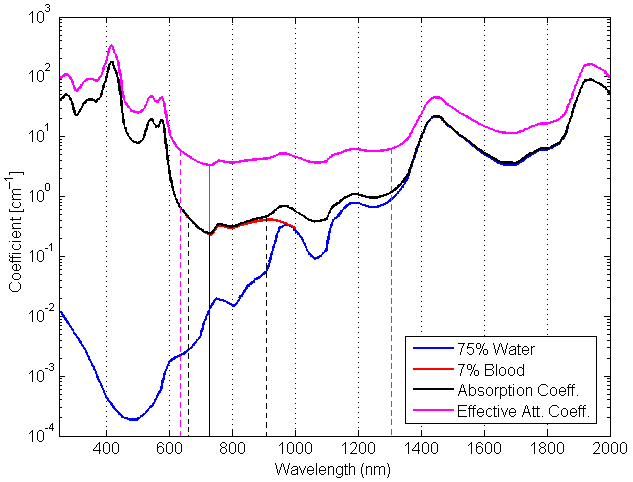
Figure 6 (c): Spectra for breast tissue (StO_{2} ≈ 70%).

Absorption coefficient: λ_{min} = 730 nm; NIR window = (656–916) nm.

Effective attenuation coefficient: λ_{min} = 730 nm; NIR window = (626–1316) nm.

=== Absorption spectrum for arteries ===
In this case $SaO_2 \,$ ≈ 98% (arterial oxygen saturation). Then oxyhemoglobin will be dominant in the total absorption (black) and the effective attenuation (magenta) coefficient spectra, as shown in Figure 6 (a). 'cite: Anisotropic diffusion filter for dorsal hand vein features extraction – Sarah Hachemi Benziane, Abdelkader Benyettou'

=== Absorption spectrum for veins ===
In this case $SvO_2 \,$ ≈ 60% (venous oxygen saturation). Then oxyhemoglobin and deoxyhemoglobin will have similar contributions to the total absorption (black) and the effective attenuation (magenta) coefficient spectra, as shown in Figure 6 (b).

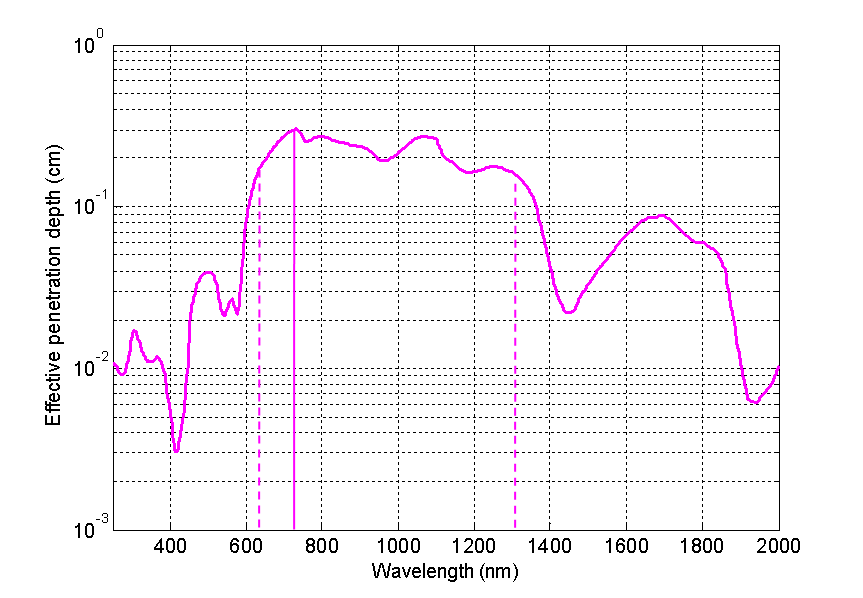
Figure 7: : Effective penetration depth in breast tissue (StO2 ≈ 70%). Effective attenuation coefficient: λ_{min} = 730 nm; NIR window = (626–1316) nm.

=== Absorption spectrum for breast tissue ===
To define $StO_2 \,$ (tissue oxygen saturation) (or $TSI \,$ (tissue saturation index)), it is necessary to define a distribution of arteries and veins in tissue. an arterial-venous blood volume ratio of 20%/80% can be adopted. Thus tissue oxygen saturation can be defined as $StO_2 \,$ = 0.2 x $SaO_2 \,$ + 0.8 x $SvO_2 \,$ ≈ 70%.

The total absorption (black) and the effective attenuation (magenta) coefficient spectra for breast tissue is shown in Figure 6 (c). In addition, the effective penetration depth is plotted in Figure 7.

== See also ==
- Near-infrared spectroscopy
- Optical window
