= Rachel Brem =

American radiologist and physician

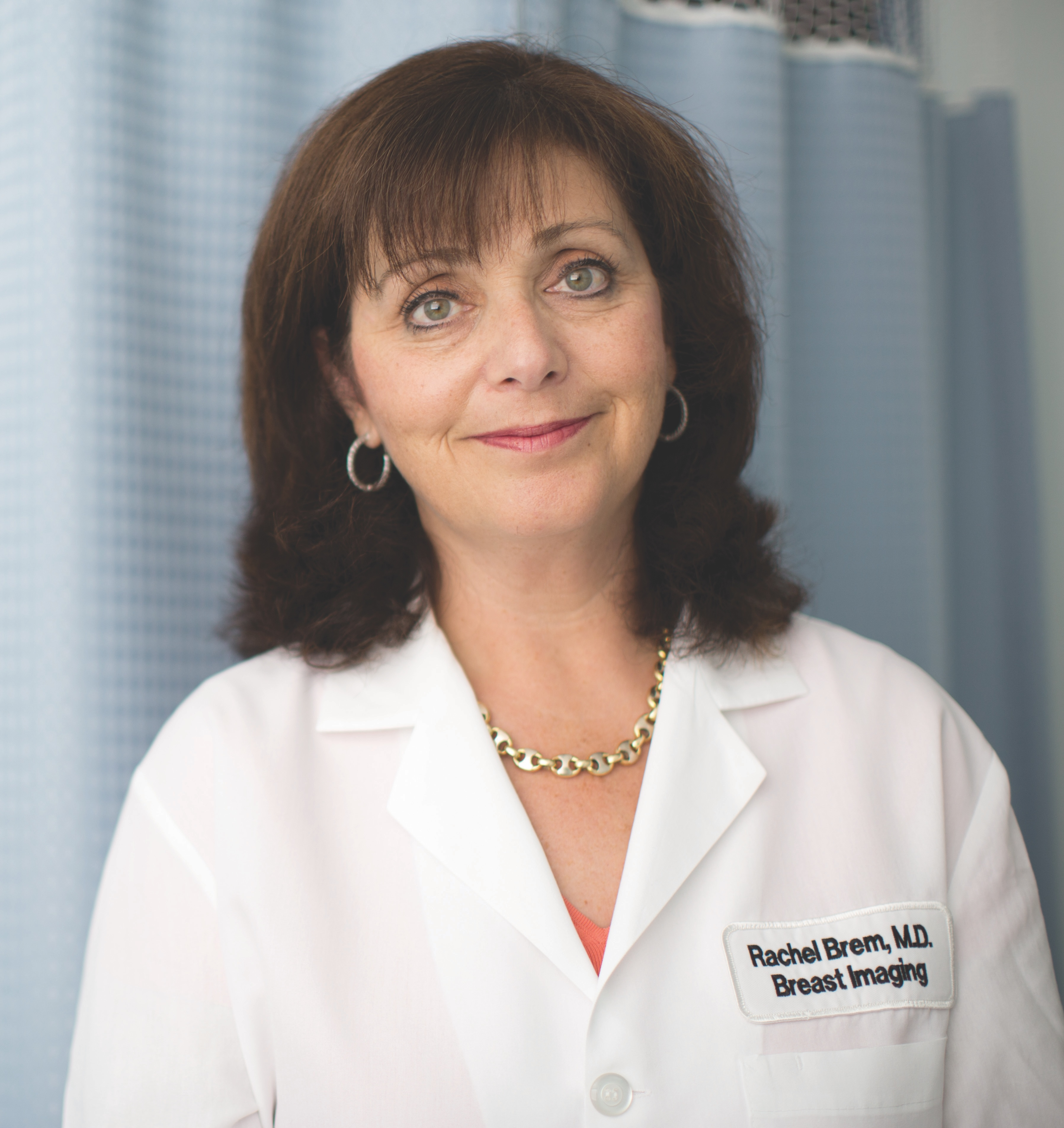
- Education: Columbia University, Johns Hopkins School of Medicine, Brandeis University, Sinai Hospital, Johns Hopkins Hospital
- Occupation: Radiologist
- Employers: George Washington University School of Medicine & Health Sciences (2000–); Johns Hopkins School of Medicine (–2000)
- Spouse: Henry Brem
- Awards: Fellow of the American College of Radiology (2011)

Rachel F. Brem is an American diagnostic radiologist, professor of radiology at the George Washington University School of Medicine & Health Sciences, and director of the Breast Imaging and Interventional Center at George Washington University's Cancer Center. She previously served as director of Breast Imaging at Johns Hopkins. Brem develops novel technologies to better support early diagnosis and treatment of breast cancer. She is a fellow of the American College of Radiology and the Society of Breast Imaging.

== Early life and education ==
Rachel Frydman was born to Mechel Frydman and Lea Fishman, of Glen Rock, New Jersey. From a young age, Rachel wanted to be a doctor, a decision that was reinforced when her mother, Lea Frydman, was diagnosed with breast cancer when Brem was 12 years old. Despite being given only six months to live, Lea went on to survive breast and ovarian cancer and live for another 44 years.

Rachel became engaged to Henry Brem, then a medical student, while she was a student at Brandeis. Rachel Brem received a B.A. from Brandeis University in 1979. She then went to Columbia University's medical school, graduating with honors in 1984. Brem completed an internship in internal medicine at Sinai Hospital of Baltimore (1984–1985), and a residency in diagnostic radiology (1985–1989) and a fellowship in breast imaging (1989–1990) at Johns Hopkins. She holds board certification in diagnostic radiology.

In the mid-1990s, researchers discovered that Ashkenazi Jewish families were at higher risk for breast cancer due to the BRCA mutation. In 1996, after a maternal aunt had also been diagnosed with breast cancer, Brem chose to be tested for the gene. It was detected, and she scheduled a radical mastectomy on the basis of her genetic results. Ironically, she subsequently detected the presence of a tumor in her breast while testing ultrasound equipment for her hospital. She said she felt lucky because she had the equipment to find it. Brem strongly recommends early testing for women who are of Ashkenazi Jewish descent or who have a family history of breast cancer.

== Career ==
External videos
- Dr. Rachel Brem: Breakthrough Women in Science & Medicine, PBS
- Co-Pilot Your Breast Health with Dr. Rachel Brem, March 19, 2024
- Dr. Rachel Brem is a Breast Cancer Survivor and now a COVID-19 Survivor and she has an Important Message to Share with You, April 3, 2020

After completing her training, Brem joined the faculty at Johns Hopkins, where she became the Director of Breast Imaging. Between 1991 and 1999 she introduced the use of image-guided techniques for minimally invasive surgery at Johns Hopkins. Throughout her career she has been active in developing new technologies for early, less invasive detection of breast cancer particularly in women with dense breast tissue.

In 2000, Brem moved to George Washington University (GWU) where she became a Professor of Radiology at the George Washington University School of Medicine & Health Sciences. In 2015 she became the Program Leader for Breast Cancer at the GW Cancer Center, which is collaboratively operated by the GW Hospital, Medical Faculty Associates, School of Medicine and Health Sciences. She is currently the Director of Breast Imaging and Intervention at George Washington University Medical Center and a Professor of Radiology at George Washington University School of Medicine & Health Sciences, as well as a Vice Chair of Research and Faculty Development for the Department of Radiology.

Brem is known for her research, publishing and mentoring of students. Brem is a principal investigator for clinical trials which have included approaches to molecular breast imaging and detection of breast cancer. Brem is active in developing new technologies to decrease difficulty and cost and improve effectiveness of breast cancer diagnosis and treatment. Approaches she is investigating include breast-specific gamma imaging (BSGI), ultrasound tomography, the use of artificial intelligence to increase accuracy of cancer detection, and the development of a non-invasive breath test for breast cancer detection.

Brem has helped to develop two new breast imaging technologies which have been reviewed by the U.S. Food and Drug Administration (FDA) and approved for clinical use. In 2012, the FDA approved the Automated Breast Ultrasound System (ABUS). In 2021, the FDA granted premarket approval (PMA) to the SoftVue™ 3D Whole Breast Ultrasound Tomography System as an adjunct to digital mammography. Both are particularly suited to the detection of breast cancer in women with dense breasts.

She has published over 100 journal articles about breast cancer. She is the co-author with Christy Teal of the book No Longer Radical: Understanding Mastectomies and Choosing the Breast Cancer Care That's Right For You (2023).

Brem has directed the Mobile Mammography program at George Washington University. The Mammovan initiative was organized in 1995, before Brem joined GWU. By sending out mobile diagnostic units to neighborhoods and businesses, the project makes cancer care more accessible to women in underserved communities.

In 2004, Brem founded the Brem Foundation to Defeat Breast Cancer, to support research, education and clinical care. Through the Brem Foundation, she has worked with Lyft to create the Lyft on Wheels for Women program, which provides free transportation to and from breast cancer screenings for women in the Washington, D.C., and Maryland areas. The Brem Foundation has also developed an online tool for risk assessment, called CheckMate, to help women assess their personal breast cancer risk given their family's medical history. They can then discuss the assessment and their concerns with their health care providers.

Brem advises legislative policy-makers on the importance of education, awareness, diagnosis and treatment of breast cancer. She advocates for policies to require that women with dense breasts be informed of the possible need for additional types of breast cancer screenings. She recommends that medical plans should cover breast cancer screening methods such as MRIs and ultrasounds, not just mammograms. She has supported legislation such as the bipartisan Find it Early Act.

Brem serves on scientific advisory boards for the Prevent Cancer Foundation, Facing Our Risk of Cancer Empowered (FORCE), and the Dr. Cyrus and Myrtle Katzen Cancer Research Center. She was appointed to the Board of Delphinus Medical Technologies in 2019. As of 2024, she was appointed to the Board of Directors of Breathe BioMedical (BBM), serving as Executive Director and Chief Medical Officer.

== Awards and honors ==
- 1998, Fellow, Society of Breast Imaging
- 2002, Ten Women to Watch, Jewish Women International
- 2009, Woman of Valor award, Chabad at Johns Hopkins
- 2010, Editors Recognition Awards, with distinction, Radiology
- 2011, Fellow, American College of Radiology (ACR)
- 2015, Top Cancer Doctors, Newsweek
- America's Top Doctors, Castle Connolly book series (6th–14th Editions)
- America's Top Doctors for Cancer, Castle Connolly book series (5th–10th Editions)

== Selected publications ==
- Brem, Rachel; Teal, Christy (May 16, 2023). No Longer Radical: Understanding Mastectomies and Choosing the Breast Cancer Care That's Right For You. Simon and Schuster. ISBN 978-1-6680-0115-8.
- Zafar, Nadia; Wolf, Andrea B; Kepniss, Julia L; Teal, Ashley C; Brem, Rachel F (April 1, 2024). "Effectiveness of Community Education for Breast Cancer Screening". Journal of Breast Imaging. 6 (2): 166–174. doi:10.1093/jbi/wbae002. PMID 38412358.
- Katzen, Janine T; Grimm, Lars J; Brem, Rachel F (January 7, 2021). "The American College of Radiology/Society of Breast Imaging Updated Fellowship Training Curriculum for Breast Imaging". Journal of Breast Imaging. 3 (4): 498–501. doi:10.1093/jbi/wbaa112. ISSN 2631-6110. PMID 38424786.
- Duric, Neb; Sak, Mark; Fan, Shaoqi; Pfeiffer, Ruth M.; Littrup, Peter J.; Simon, Michael S.; Gorski, David H.; Ali, Haythem; Purrington, Kristen S.; Brem, Rachel F.; Sherman, Mark E.; Gierach, Gretchen L. (February 2020). "Using Whole Breast Ultrasound Tomography to Improve Breast Cancer Risk Assessment: A Novel Risk Factor Based on the Quantitative Tissue Property of Sound Speed". Journal of Clinical Medicine. 9 (2): 367. doi:10.3390/jcm9020367. ISSN 2077-0383. PMC 7074100. PMID 32013177.
- Huppe, Ashley I.; Mehta, Anita K.; Brem, Rachel F. (February 2018). "Molecular Breast Imaging: A Comprehensive Review". Seminars in Ultrasound, CT, and MR. 39 (1): 60–69. doi:10.1053/j.sult.2017.10.001. ISSN 1558-5034. PMID 29317040.
- Thigpen, Denise; Kappler, Amanda; Brem, Rachel (March 16, 2018). "The Role of Ultrasound in Screening Dense Breasts—A Review of the Literature and Practical Solutions for Implementation". Diagnostics. 8 (1): 20. doi:10.3390/diagnostics8010020. PMC 5872003. PMID 29547532.
- Brem, Rachel F.; Tabár, László; Duffy, Stephen W.; Inciardi, Marc F.; Guingrich, Jessica A.; Hashimoto, Beverly E.; Lander, Marla R.; Lapidus, Robert L.; Peterson, Mary Kay; Rapelyea, Jocelyn A.; Roux, Susan; Schilling, Kathy J.; Shah, Biren A.; Torrente, Jessica; Wynn, Ralph T.; Miller, Dave P. (March 2015). "Assessing Improvement in Detection of Breast Cancer with Three-dimensional Automated Breast US in Women with Dense Breast Tissue: The SomoInsight Study". Radiology. 274 (3): 663–673. doi:10.1148/radiol.14132832. ISSN 0033-8419. PMID 25329763.
- Rechtman, Lauren R.; Lenihan, Megan J.; Lieberman, Jennifer H.; Teal, Christine B.; Torrente, Jessica; Rapelyea, Jocelyn A.; Brem, Rachel F. (February 2014). "Breast-Specific Gamma Imaging for the Detection of Breast Cancer in Dense Versus Nondense Breasts". American Journal of Roentgenology. 202 (2): 293–298. doi:10.2214/AJR.13.11585. ISSN 0361-803X. PMID 24450668.
- Brem, Rachel F.; Lenihan, Megan J.; Lieberman, Jennifer; Torrente, Jessica (February 2015). "Screening Breast Ultrasound: Past, Present, and Future". American Journal of Roentgenology. 204 (2): 234–240. doi:10.2214/AJR.13.12072. PMID 25615743.
- Brem, Rachel F.; Ioffe, Marina; Rapelyea, Jocelyn A.; Yost, Kristen G.; Weigert, Jean M.; Bertrand, Margaret L.; Stern, Lillian H. (February 2009). "Invasive Lobular Carcinoma: Detection with Mammography, Sonography, MRI, and Breast-Specific Gamma Imaging". American Journal of Roentgenology. 192 (2): 379–383. doi:10.2214/AJR.07.3827. PMID 19155397.
- Brem, Rachel F.; Floerke, Angelique C.; Rapelyea, Jocelyn A.; Teal, Christine; Kelly, Tricia; Mathur, Vivek (June 2008). "Breast-specific Gamma Imaging as an Adjunct Imaging Modality for the Diagnosis of Breast Cancer". Radiology. 247 (3): 651–657. doi:10.1148/radiol.2473061678. PMID 18487533.
- Brem, Rachel F.; Hoffmeister, Jeffrey W.; Rapelyea, Jocelyn A.; Zisman, Gilat; Mohtashemi, Kevin; Jindal, Guarav; DiSimio, Martin P.; Rogers, Steven K. (February 2005). "Impact of Breast Density on Computer-Aided Detection for Breast Cancer". American Journal of Roentgenology. 184 (2): 439–444. doi:10.2214/ajr.184.2.01840439. ISSN 0361-803X. PMID 15671360.
