= Henda's Law =

American breast density notification law

Texas State Legislature
- Full name: Henda's Law
- Signed into law: June 17, 2011
- Sponsor: May 29, 2011
- Governor: Rick Perry

Status: Current legislation

HB 2102, also known as "Henda's Law", is a breast density (BD) notification law in Texas. It requires that mammography patients be provided educational materials on dense breast tissue can hide abnormalities, including breast cancer, from traditional screening. Henda's Law aims to promote patient–doctor discussion as well as reduce the rate of false negatives, as mammography may not detect abnormalities in dense breasts. The law was enacted, and approved by the FDA, in 2011.

== HB 2102 ==
The legislation Texas HB 2102 requires that a certified mammography facility approved by the FDA or a certification agency approved by the FDA, shall upon completion of the mammogram provide to the patient educational materials about how dense breast tissue is prevalent and normal, and how it can reduce the efficacy of traditional screening tools such as mammograms. HB 2102 seeks to raise awareness, not standardize care, and is not admissible evidence in a court of law.

== History ==
The law was named after Henda Salmeron, a breast cancer survivor and an activist since 2009, who helped draft Henda's Law. She lobbied to change the standard of care for women with dense breast tissue through the Texas House Bill HB 2102, "Henda's Law", requiring every mammography provider to specifically notify women that they have dense breast tissue and the increased risks associated therewith. Though originally drafted by Texas State Representative Allen Vaught, the bill was officially authored by Representatives Kenneth Sheets and Anna Hernandez Luna. Governor Rick Perry signed Henda's Law, HB 2102, on June 17, 2011. It took effect on September 1, 2011.

By 2015, 19 states had legal notification statutes for dense breast tissue. The federal Mammography Quality Standards Act (MQSA) requires all patients to be notified of their breast density ("dense" or "not dense") in their mammogram reports as of September 10, 2024.

== Impact and reception ==
Between 2011 and 2013, dense breast MRIs increased by 23 times their pre-HB 2102 levels. Alena Allen wrote that the purpose of this legislation would have been better served as a public health initiative rather than targeting the physician and eroding the patient-physician trust, as well as the cost for further supplemental tests. Studies concluded that breast density legislation lead to 1.8 to 3.2 additional patient cancer detection out of 1000 patients, had no consistent effect on radiologist's BD clarifications, that dense breast (DB) legislation had substantial additional economic burden, and that digital breast tomosynthesis (DBT) was more cost-effective than ultrasound. One study found that radiologists downgraded their breast density assessments to avoid DB notification for 10 months following the new law, then returned to pre-legislation reporting standards. Women with greater than high school education in DB legislation states had higher notification rates than in non-DB states, but there was no statistical difference in women with a high school education or less. One study found that BD notification letters may be too difficult for the general public to read (exceeded 8th grade reading level), and that public websites performed better.
