= Nancy Cappello =

American breast cancer activist (1952–2018)

- Born: Nancy Marcucci; October 30, 1952; Waterbury, Connecticut, U.S.
- Died: November 15, 2018 (aged 66); Waterbury, Connecticut, U.S.
- Education: Watertown High School; Central Connecticut State University (MEd); University of Connecticut (PhD)
- Occupation: Activist
- Years active: 2003–2018
- Known for: Advocate for implementation of dense breast tissue notification laws
- Spouse: Joseph J. Cappello (m. 1974)

Nancy Cappello (née Marcucci; October 30, 1952 – November 15, 2018) was an American breast cancer activist who was known for her campaign to improve disclosure on the limitations of mammography and the difficulty in identifying cancer for those with dense breast tissue. She worked as a special education teacher in her hometown of Waterbury, Connecticut, and later as an educational administrator in the Connecticut state department.

After being diagnosed with breast cancer in 2003, Cappello started an organization called Are You Dense? in order to improve notification laws for women with dense breasts, as it was due to not being informed that her cancer had not been identified sooner through non-mammogram methods. By 2019, 37 U.S. states had passed a breast density inform law as she had advocated, along with a federal law being passed to update the notification rules in February 2019.

== Early life and education ==
Cappello was born in Waterbury, Connecticut, on October 30, 1952, to Stephen A. Marcucci, a plumbing business owner, and Antoinette Llorens. She attended Watertown High School and went on to earn a Master's degree in education and special education from the Central Connecticut State University. Then, she earned a PhD at the University of Connecticut with a focus on educational administration.

== Career ==
Starting in 1974, Cappello worked as a special education teacher at her former high school and eventually became the city's director of special education. This resulted in her becoming a consultant on such subjects with the Connecticut state education department and she eventually became interim bureau chief for the department in 2007. She retired in 2009 from state work to focus on her advocacy outreach.

== Advocacy ==
=== Breast cancer diagnosis ===
The beginning to Cappello's activism regarding mammography was in 2003 after her doctor physically identified a lump on her breast, despite nothing of the sort having been identified in a mammogram weeks earlier and still not being detected in a follow-up mammogram after noticing the lump. An ultrasound was able to properly identify the mass, however, as a tumor that had already spread to become a stage 3 lymph node cancer that could only be treated with chemotherapy and a mastectomy of the affected breast.

The reason why the mammograms had been unsuccessful in identifying the tumor was due to her having dense breast tissue with low amounts of fat that prevented X-ray scans from penetrating into the tissue and separating darker fat pockets from the bright white tumor tissue. She was also informed that this type of breast tissue increases the risk of cancer forming, despite cancer being difficult to diagnose at the same time for such tissue.

Having been unaware of the existence of dense breast tissue or the frequency of it occurring in women, Cappello was "outraged" at not having been informed earlier, as she would have been undergoing ultrasounds rather than mammograms for the prior 10 years if she had known she had the condition. She estimated that due to the growth and extent of the cancer once it was finally detected, it had been growing for several years and had not been identified by any of her scans during that time period. Her doctors also said that informing female patients about the possibility of dense breast tissue was not a part of the "standard protocol" and so she and her husband decided to start advocating for changes to the protocol.

=== Creation of advocacy group ===
The couple interacted with medical experts and state politicians over the following years, resulting in a law and protocol change in Connecticut in 2009 requiring doctors to inform patients about dense breast tissue and to require that medical insurance would cover the alternative ultrasounds such patients would need. Receiving messages from women across the US wanting such laws passed in their states, Cappello and her husband created the non-profit Are You Dense? in 2008 to advocate for such legal changes. She would go on to speak on the subject internationally at various medical conventions, including in countries such as Japan, France, Italy and Canada.

As of 2019, 37 states had passed a version of the breast density inform law that she had advocated for. A federal notification bill was signed into law in February 2019. Cappello was described by Imaging Technology News as the "founder of the breast density education movement".

== Personal life ==
Cappello was married to her husband, Joseph J. Cappello, in 1974. She was diagnosed with myelodysplastic syndrome in September 2018 that was identified as having formed during the treatment for her cancer in 2004. A bone marrow transplant was scheduled for December of that year to cure the syndrome, but a series of transfusions and antibiotics were required as treatment and multiple infections occurred in the following months. She died on November 15, 2018, due to a Clostridioides difficile infection.
