= PanFlu =

PanFlu can refer to:

- pandemic influenza
- Panflu or PANFLU.1, specific pandemic flu vaccines from Sinovac Biotech
- a preclinical pan flu vaccine against flu replikins.
