= Alla Reznik =

Medical and solid-state physicist

Alla Reznik is a medical physicist and solid-state physicist whose research involves the development of semiconductor-based sensors for medical imaging, including positron emission mammography, X-ray imaging, and gamma-ray imaging. She has lived and worked in Ukraine, Israel, and Canada, where she is a professor of physics at Lakehead University in Thunder Bay, a senior scientist at the Thunder Bay Regional Health Research Institute, and the holder of a tier 1 Canada Research Chair in the Physics of Molecular Imaging.

== Education and career ==
Reznik received a master's degree from Taras Shevchenko National University of Kyiv in 1985, and a doctorate through the National Academy of Sciences of Ukraine in 1991. She worked as a researcher in physics at the Kyiv Polytechnic Institute in Ukraine from 1986 to 1994.

She came to Israel in 1995 as a researcher in the Solid State Institute of the Technion – Israel Institute of Technology, and received a second doctorate from the Technion in 2001. From 2000 to 2003 she worked in industry in Israel, as a physicist for GE HealthCare.

In 2003, she moved again, from Israel to Canada. She became a postdoctoral researcher at the Sunnybrook Health Sciences Centre, affiliated with the University of Toronto, and continued there as a researcher until 2007. In 2007, she took a part-time position with the Thunder Bay Regional Health Research Institute, and in 2008 she added an assistant professorship of physics at Lakehead University. She has been a full professor at Lakehead University since 2013.

== Recognition ==
Reznik was given a Tier 2 Canada Research Chair in the Physics of Molecular Imaging in 2008 and was re-elected for a second term in 2013. In 2018 she received a Tier 1 chair in the Physics of Radiation Medical Imaging, and was promoted to a second 7-year term for the Tier 1 position in 2025. She was named as a Fellow of the American Physical Society (APS) in 2025, after a nomination from the APS Forum on Industrial & Applied Physics, "for pioneering contributions to physics research and impactful industrial applications in radiation medical imaging, advancing the field by successfully translating research results into groundbreaking real-world technologies". In 2025 Reznik was awarded the prestigious King Charles III Coronation Medal.
