= Molecular breast imaging =

Scintimammography
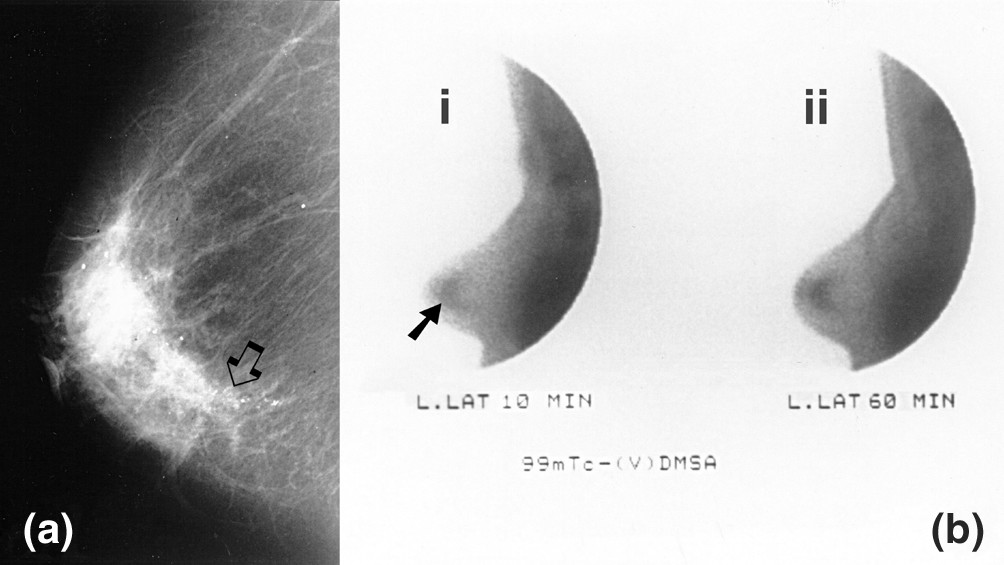
- Mammography (left) and DMSA scintimammography (right) images of 4.5cm breast carcinoma
- Synonyms: Nuclear medicine breast imaging Breast specific gamma imaging Breast scintigraphy Molecular breast imaging
- ICD-10-PCS: CH1
- ICD-9-CM: 92.19
- HCPCS-L2: S8080

Molecular breast imaging (MBI), also known as scintimammography, is a type of breast imaging test that is used to detect cancer cells in breast tissue of individuals who have had abnormal mammograms, especially for those who have dense breast tissue, post-operative scar tissue or breast implants.

MBI is not used for screening or in place of a mammogram. Rather, it is used when the detection of breast abnormalities is not possible or not reliable on the basis of mammography and ultrasound alone. When mammography plus ultrasound are insufficient to characterize an abnormality, the gold standard next step is Magnetic Resonance Imaging (MRI) of the breast. However, in patients with contraindications (e.g. certain implantable devices) or who prefer to avoid MRI (claustrophobia, discomfort), use of scintimammography is an acceptable alternative.

== Mechanism ==
Scintiamammorgraphy is based on the principle of scintigraphy, where the gamma radiation emitted from injected radiopharmaceuticals is measured by gamma cameras. Cancer cells take up radiopharmaceutical at a higher rate than surrounding normal tissue, and as such they show up on scintigraphy as areas of increases gamma radiation emission. A limitation to this principle is that not all breast lesions with metabolic activity higher than background are cancerous (eg fibroadenoma), and as such judicious use of molecular breast imaging by breast imagers is required.

The most common radiopharmaceutical used in MBI is ^{99m}Tc-sestamibi, with doses of 240-300 MBq in current protocols, resulting in an effective dose to a patient of around 2.4 mSv. Earlier iterations of MBI required much higher doses of radiation up to 1100 MBq, which in part led to MBI falling out of favor in the latter part of the last century. However advances in gamma camera technology such as breast specific gamma imaging (BSGI) have allowed for quality resolution at much lower radiation doses, and as such there has been increasing use of MBI.

Molecular breast imaging added to screening mammogram increases cancer detection rate by about 7-16 positive results per 1000 tests completed, however the dose of radiation experienced by the patient is increased.

== Procedure ==
The procedure is conducted according to practice guidelines corresponding to the region where they are performed (American College of Radiology guidelines in the U.S.). A patient can expect to receive an injection of radiopharmaceutical agent intravenously in the arm contralateral to the breast under investigation. After waiting 5–10 minutes, the breast tissue is placed into the MBI system and a series of images are obtained. Imaging time for both breasts is approximately 40 minutes. For lesions identifiable on MBI but not mammography or ultrasound, MBI guided biopsy is appropriate.

== Equipment ==
Breast-specific gamma cameras have been developed with a smaller field of view than conventional cameras, allowing higher resolution imagery and compression of the breast as in x-ray mammography (which improves detection of smaller lesions).

== Clinical indications ==
Mammography is widely accepted as the first-line screening option for the detection of breast cancer, with a sensitivity for detection of cancer at around 85-90%. However, in patients with dense breast tissue or those with risk of breast cancer greater than 20%, the sensitivity of mammography drops significantly, with some studies reporting a sensitivity of less than 50%. In these patients, many centers utilize breast ultrasound as additional screening modality, which studies have shown increases breast cancer detection by 2 cancers detected per 1000 people screened. Ultrasound also plays an important role in further characterization of indeterminate lesions seen on screening mammography, but it does result in a significant increase in false positive rate when compared to mammography alone. Breast MRI is considered the gold-standard in supplemental imaging of dense breasts, with an increase in cancer detection of about 15 cancers per 1000 screens. In patients where MRI is contraindicated (certain implantable devices, certain kidney conditions) or in those who prefer to avoid MRI (claustrophobia), molecular breast imaging is a viable alternative. MBI has shown to increase detection of breast cancer in dense breasts by 7-16 cancers per 1000 screens.

== See also ==
- Technetium (99mTc) sestamibi
- Nuclear medicine
- Positron emission mammography
