= Positron emission mammography =

Imaging procedure used to detect breast cancer

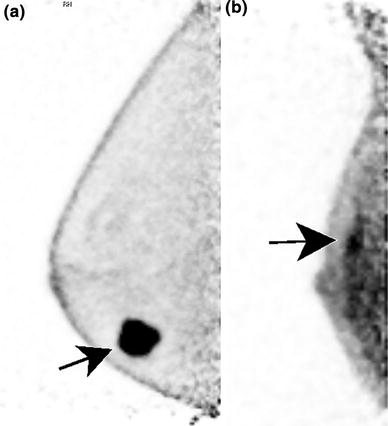
- Two PEM images, including sites of tracer uptake
- Purpose: imaging modality used to detect breast cancer

Positron emission mammography (PEM) is a nuclear medicine imaging modality used to detect or characterise breast cancer. Mammography typically refers to x-ray imaging of the breast, while PEM uses an injected positron emitting isotope and a dedicated scanner to locate breast tumors. Scintimammography is another nuclear medicine breast imaging technique, however it is performed using a gamma camera. Breasts can be imaged on standard whole-body PET scanners, however dedicated PEM scanners offer advantages including improved resolution.

PEM is not recommended for routine use or for breast cancer screening, in part due to higher radiation dose compared to other modalities. Compared to breast MRI, PEM offers higher specificity. Specific indications can include "high-risk patients with masses > 2 cm or aggressive malignancy and serum tumor marker elevation". ^{18}F-FDG is the most common radiopharmaceutical used for PEM.

== Equipment ==
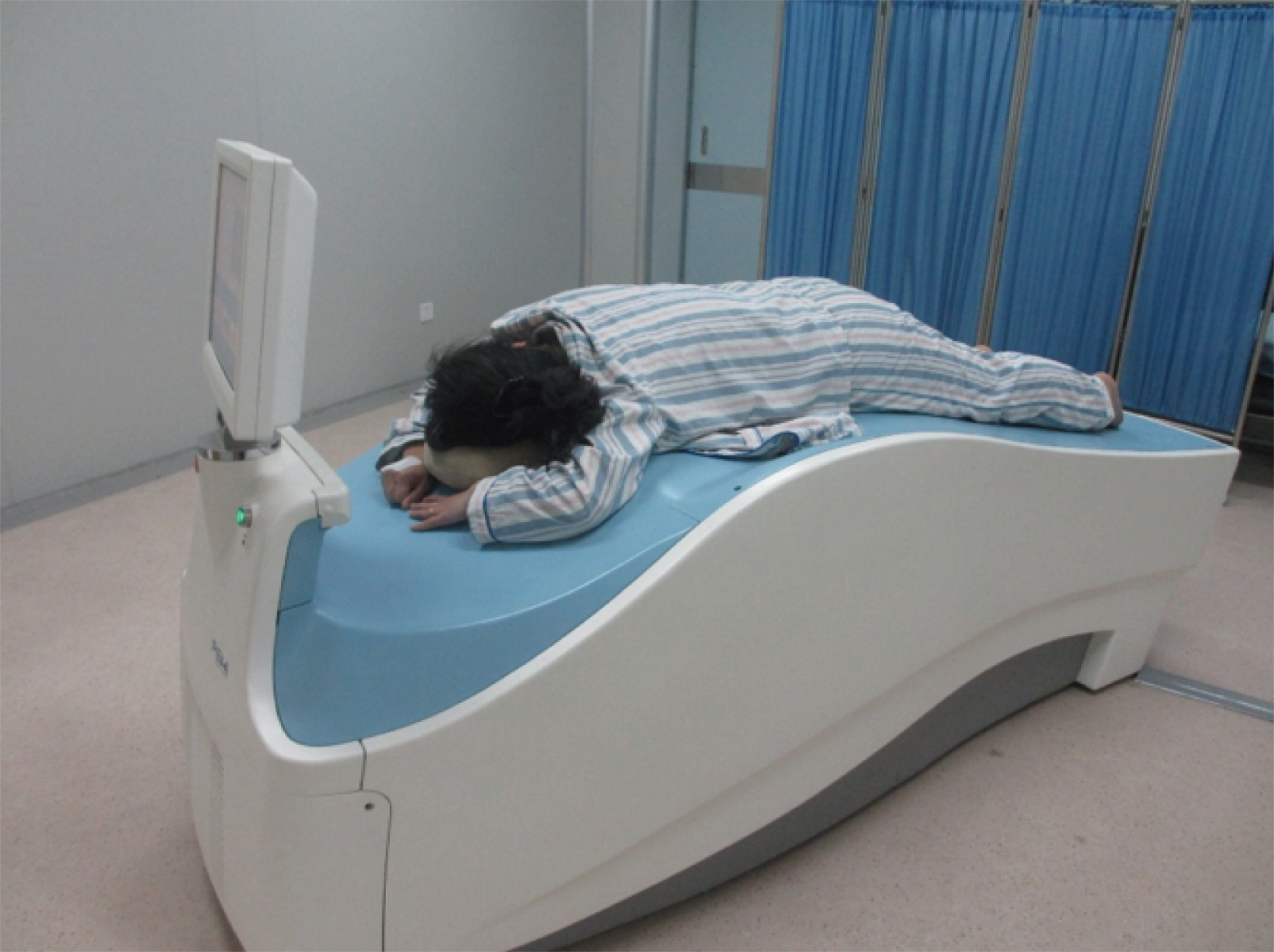
A commercial PEM system with 64-ring detectors. It is designed for prone imaging, so that the breasts hang freely in the detector, through an opening.

PEM uses a specialised scanning system. Though some systems resemble a small PET scanner with a ring of detectors, others consist of a pair of gamma radiation detectors placed above and below the breast. On these systems, mild breast compression is applied to spread the breast and reduce its thickness. The detection process is identical to standard PET scanners. Positrons emitted by the injected ^{18}F-FDG annihilate on interaction with electrons in tissue, leading to the emission of a pair of photons travelling in opposite directions. The detection of two simultaneous photons indicates the emission of a positron at a point on the line linking the two detection events. An image is the reconstructed from the collected emission data.

== History ==
Mammography using positron emitters was first proposed in 1994. PEM is now approved in the United States and Europe for post-diagnosis imaging, with multiple commercial systems available.

== See also ==
- Breast ultrasound
