= Replikins =

Class of peptides

Replikins, according to some studies, are short peptide sequences characterized by recurring appearances of lysine and histidine residues. One study described these sequences as being 7 to 50 amino acids long, containing two or more lysine residues, at least one histidine, and a 6% or more concentration of lysine. They are typically identified by calculating a "replikin count," which reflects the frequency of these sequences per 100 amino acids in a protein. Some studies have proposed that increases in replikin concentration may correspond with rapid viral replication or changes in pathological behavior, including in the analyses of influenza outbreaks. Replikins have also been investigated in experimental peptide vaccines and in studies exploring potential connections between genomic replikin counts and cancer lethality.

A method for identifying replikins was patented by Samuel and Elenore S. Bogoch in 2001. The peptide group was first identified by a proprietary company called Replikins, who have trademarked the name "Replikin Count".

== Proposed research applications ==
=== Viral Outbreak Prediction ===
A 2011 study by Bogoch and Bogoch suggested that increases in "replikin counts" within influenza viruses, like H1N1 and H5N1, may happen before or during major outbreaks. The authors also noted similar patterns in H5N1, where higher replikin concentrations were observed in strains linked to greater infectivity. They proposed that these changes could act as early signals for emerging or rapidly spreading strains, although this idea has not been supported in broader research.

=== Vaccine research ===
A study tested a synthetic replikin peptide vaccine against a low-pathogenicity H5 influenza in chickens. The authors reported that the vaccinated birds did not shed detectable virus after being challenged with the same strain. They suggested that reducing virus shedding could lower the chance of low-pathogenic H5 viruses evolving into highly pathogenic forms, and mentioned that the vaccine could be delivered through mass application to the upper respiratory tract.

=== Replikins and Cancer ===
A preprint by Bogoch and Bogoch reported that cancer types with higher "replikin counts" in their genomic proteins were associated with higher mortality rates. The authors compared replikin counts across different cancer cell types and suggested that rapidly lethal cancers, such as glioblastoma and non-small-cell lung cancer, had some of the highest measured counts. They also described a related antibody called antimalignin antibody and claimed there was an increase in concentration during active cancer and returned to lower levels during remission. The authors proposed that replikin concentration might connect to how rapidly certain cancers replicate, but these findings have not been independently confirmed.

== See also ==
- 2009 flu pandemic
