= Dense breast tissue =

Condition of human breasts

- Mammograms depicting four levels of increasing breast density with corresponding mammography sensitivity.
- Diagnostic method: Mammogram
- Prognosis: Increased risk of breast cancer, and late diagnosis of breast cancer

Dense breast tissue, also known as dense breasts, is a condition of the breasts where a higher proportion of the breasts are made up of glandular tissue and fibrous tissue than fatty tissue. Around 40–50% of women have dense breast tissue and one of the main medical components of the condition is that mammograms are unable to differentiate tumorous tissue from the surrounding dense tissue. This increases the risk of late diagnosis of breast cancer in women with dense breast tissue. Additionally, women with such tissue have a higher likelihood of developing breast cancer in general, though the reasons for this are poorly understood.

== Definition and prevalence ==
Dense breast tissue is defined based on the amount of glandular and fibrous tissue as compared to the percentage of fatty tissue. The current mammography classifications split up the density of breasts into four categories. Approximately 10% of women have almost entirely fatty breasts, 40% with small pockets of dense tissue, 40% with even distribution of dense tissue throughout, and 10% with extremely dense tissue. The latter two groups are those included under the definition of dense breasts. These categories were officially determined as a part of the American College of Radiology's Breast Imaging Reporting and Data System (BI-RADS).

Dense breast tissue, which is affected by hormone levels including estrogen, is more common among younger, pre-menopausal women and decreases with age. Other factors include genetics and body mass index (BMI), with those with higher BMIs tending to have less dense tissue.

When undergoing a mammogram, tissue density is differentiated with bright and dark spots, with the radiolucent dark areas representing fatty tissue and the radioopaque bright spots representing combined fibroglandular tissue. Assessing the new growth of a tumor as a bright spot is the primary method radiologists use to identify early-stage cancer. However, women with dense breasts have an overall white coloration referred to as the "masking effect" that prevents the identification of new bright spots in the tissue.

== History ==
The problem of dense breasts and mammography screenings was first identified by John Wolfe in 1976 where Wolfe laid out a new classification system based on the density of female breasts and the prominence of fibral duct tissue. He also noted that the higher the density of a woman's breasts and how the pattern of the parenchymal tissue of the breasts formed, the higher the correlative risk there was for developing breast cancer, with the densest examples seeing a 37-fold increased risk. His findings, however, were not replicable by other researchers and so his claims about the connection between dense breasts and a higher risk of cancer were dismissed by the radiology community.

While it was agreed that the "masking effect" impact of dense breasts on conducting mammograms made it difficult to identify developing breast cancer, it was not until a 2007 publication by Norman Boyd that a replication of Wolfe's work was shown. Boyd compared a wide variety of case controls and the risk of the women developing cancer over time based on the density of their breasts. He found on the extreme ends that women with a high breast density developed cancer at a rate five times higher than those with almost entirely fatty breast tissue. It has also been suggested by some researchers, such as in Byrne et al. (1995), that breast density is the greatest risk factor to the development of breast cancer.

Boyd suggested a new classification system that went beyond Wolfe's and titled his the Six Class Categories (SCC) that split up breasts based on the percentage density of fibroglandular versus fatty tissue. A third classification system was suggested by Tabar et al. (2005) that took into account the percentage of all three types of tissue and the linear density and defined six groups based on all four percentages at once.

== Legislation and guidelines ==
The creation of legislation related to dense breasts has focused on requiring the notification of women by their medical provider that they have dense breasts after this is diagnosed during mammograms, along with improving general awareness of the condition among the public.

Arguments against such legislation by some medical providers and physicians have been concerns that notification of such risks would result in women avoiding mammograms in fear of receiving a breast cancer diagnosis. Yeh et al. (2015) found that notifying women resulted in an overall increase in intention of the informed individuals to have future ultrasounds and other testing to account for the higher potential risk of developing breast cancer. However, the authors noted that women with a high level of ambiguity aversion were less likely to desire future mammograms; this was especially true for women where ultrasounds were not covered by their health insurance. A 2023 review of guidelines found that in general, patients wanted to receive their density information.

A 2024 review of guidelines on dense breasts found that most sets of guidelines recommend annual or biannual screening mammograms for those over the age of 40 who have dense breasts, or potentially tomosynthesis imaging or breast MRI. Though some guidelines do not recommend additional screening, most updated or published in 2023–2024 recommend supplemental screening, such as ultrasound. Most place an emphasis on shared decision-making between patient and doctor; several also include providing information on modifiable cancer risk factors such as alcohol consumption and smoking, obesity, and hormonal factors.

=== North America ===
==== United States ====
The issues of diagnosing breast cancer for such affected women are required to be a part of the information given and the suggestion of additional testing using alternative methods. Most legislation also has any mammograms taken be given to the patient's physician and made a part of their medical record. The first state legislation on dense breast notifications was passed in 2009 in Connecticut after advocacy by breast cancer survivor Nancy Cappello, who had been diagnosed with stage 3 cancer owing to the failure of mammograms to detect the growing tumor. Other states have passed their own legislation, with Texas, for example, passing Henda's Law in 2011. By 2015, 19 states had legal notification statutes for dense breast tissue.

A federal law titled the Mammography Quality Standards Act (MQSA) already covers and regulates how mammography reports are handled and requires sending dense breast identification to physicians. But the law did not include notifying the patient; state-level laws have sought to account for this gap in regulation since 2009. A federal bill to expand the MQSA was presented to Congress in October of 2011, but was not passed. Subsequent federal bills were signed into law in February of 2019 and resulted in the FDA updating the MQSA to require reporting of mammograms to patients by all mammography facilities. The MQSA was amended again in 2023, requiring all patients to be notified of their breast density ("dense" or "not dense") in their mammogram reports as of September 10, 2024.

Research in 2021 by Kressin et al. on the impact of the state and federal laws regarding dense breasts found that notification laws increased the likelihood of women being informed about dense breasts by 1.5 times, but women who were people of color (POC) and particularly those with lower incomes were less likely to be informed by their physicians than non-POC who were in wealthier income brackets. This included being informed of the higher risk of developing breast cancer. Another 2021 review found that breast density notifications led to higher supplemental screening.

==== Canada ====
As of 2023, most provinces require notification of breast density level; some regions such as Quebec, the Northwest Territories, and Yukon record the data but do not automatically inform patients.

=== Europe ===
In 2022, the European Society of Breast Imaging, part of the European Society of Radiology, published a recommendation that women be informed at screenings of their breast density, as well as recommending MRI screening every two to four years for those between the ages of 50 and 70 with extremely dense breast tissue. A 2025 review published in the European Journal of Radiology found that MRI screening on extremely dense breasts may be limited due to inaccessibility and high cost.

=== Australia ===
The 2020 position statement from BreastScreen Australia states that the "Standing Committee on Screening recommends that, until more evidence is available on how breast density is best assessed and managed (including evidence to support clinical pathways), BreastScreen Australia should not routinely record breast density or provide supplemental testing for women with dense breasts." As of 2023, women in South Australia will be informed of their breast density after a study showed they strongly preferred to be informed of this information.
