= Henry Brem =

American medical researcher

Henry Brem, M.D.
- Education: New York University; Harvard University; Harvard Medical School; Peter Bent Brigham Hospital; Neurological Institute of New York; Columbia College of Physicians and Surgeons
- Occupations: Henry Brem Professor of Neurosurgery, Hunterian Neurosurgical Research Laboratory Brain Cancer Program at the Sidney Kimmel Cancer Center
- Known for: Image guidance computer system to deliver targeted chemotherapy to intraoperative brain tumors, viral mapping, vaccine development
- Medical career
- Field: neurosurgeon, researcher, educator, inventor
- Institutions: Johns Hopkins

Henry Brem, M.D. is an American neurosurgeon, researcher, educator and inventor known for introducing an image guidance computer system to deliver targeted chemotherapy to intraoperative brain tumors. As of 2026, he is the Henry Brem Professor of Neurosurgery at Johns Hopkins University, director, Hunterian Neurosurgical Research Laboratory and co-director, Brain Cancer Program at the Sidney Kimmel Cancer Center. Brem specializes in Ophthalmology, Oncology and Biomedical Engineering and has written more than 629 peer-reviewed articles with 52,489 citations, 50 books and book chapters and holds 11 patents.

== Education and career ==
Brem received his AB at New York University (1973) and Harvard University, Graduate School of Arts and Sciences Department of Biological Chemistry (1974), MD at Harvard Medical School, residencies at Peter Bent Brigham Hospital (Harvard) and the Neurological Institute of New York, Columbia College of Physicians and Surgeons.

In 1998, he became a member of the National Academy of Medicine.

== Research ==
Brem's fields of research include neurosurgery, brain tumors, drug delivery, angiogenesis and Immunology. Brem's research on temozolomide, often linked to ribavirin, involves a combination of scientific disciplines and uncovers new connections. His work also connects epilepsy surgery with meningioma and implant chemotherapy. His carmustine research addresses wafer integration, biodistribution and cytotoxicity.

He is credited along with Robert Langer for co-inventing the Gliadel wafer, an implantable device that enables direct chemotherapy placement during brain tumor surgery. This has led to other novel therapies, such as chemotherapy "cocktail" delivery systems by way of electrospun fiber membranes. This technology is being developed in conjunction with Andrew Steckl at the University of Cincinnati College of Engineering and Applied Science.

=== Grants ===
Brem has been the Principal- or Co-Investigator on 27 research studies focused on brain tumors and therapy delivery, such as controlled release polymers, brain-penetrating DNA nanoparticles, and enhancement of brain tumor immunotherapy.

=== Books and chapters ===
As of 2023, Brem has written 58 book chapters and monographs. Books include: Guest Editor, Special Edition: Implant Approach to Chemotherapy, (JNO) 1995, Section Editor, Youmans Textbook of Neurological Surgery-5th Edition, 2004, ISBN 072163933X, and Section Editor, Youmans Textbook of Neurological Surgery, 6th edition, 2011.

=== Patents ===
- Controlled Local Delivery of Chemotherapeutic Agents for Treating Solid Tumors Henry Brem, Robert S. Langer, Abraham J. Domb
- Cytokine Enhanced Immunotherapy for Brain Tumors Henry Brem, Drew M. Pardoll, Reid C. Thompson, Elizabeth M. Jaffee, Kam W. Leong, Matthew G. Ewend
- Antibiotic Composition for Inhibition of Angiogenesis Henry Brem, Rafael J. Tamargo, Robert A. Bok
- Vitamin D3 Analog Loaded Polymer Formulations for Cancer and Neurogenerative Disorders Martin Burke, Maria-Christina White, Jae Kyoo Lee, Mark C. Watts, Betty M. Tyler, Gary H. Posner, Henry Brem.
- Intracellular Delivery of Anionic Anti-cancer Drugs with Cationic Polymers D. Berry, G. Anderson, R Langer, B Tyler, H. Brem.
- Combination of Local Temozolomide with Local BCNU V. Renard Recinos, B. Tyler, S. Brem Sunshine, H. Brem.
- Use of Adjuvant Focused Radiation Including Stereotactic Radiosurgery for Augmenting Immune Based Therapies Against Neoplasms
- Intraoperatively Placed Markers for Post-surgical Imaging M. Lim, H. Brem, B.Tyler, J. Liauw, S. Lo
- Local Delivery Forms of Acriflavine for Treating Tumors Brem H, Mangraviti A, Olivi A, Tyler B, Raghavan T.
- Flexible Control and Guidance of Minimally Invasive Focused Ultrasound Manbachi A, Siewerdsen J, Ellens N, Zhang X, Belzberg M, Cohen A, Brem H.
- Combination of Immunotherapy with Local Chemotherapy for the Treatment of Malignancies Dimitrios M, Tyler B, Pardoll D, Brem H, Lim M
