= Mammography Quality Standards Act =

US law

- Long title: An Act to amend the Public Health Service Act to establish the authority for the regulation of mammography services and radiological equipment, and for other purposes.
- Acronyms (colloquial): MQSA
- Nicknames: Mammography Quality Standards Act of 1992
- Enacted by: the 102nd United States Congress
- Effective: October 1, 1994

Citations
- Public law: 102-539
- Statutes at Large: 106 Stat. 3547

Codification
- Titles amended: 42 U.S.C.: Public Health and Social Welfare
- U.S.C. sections created: 42 U.S.C. ch. 6A § 263b
- U.S.C. sections amended: 42 U.S.C. ch. 6A § 201 et seq.

Legislative history
- Introduced in the House as H.R. 6182 by John D. Dingell, Jr. (D–MI) on October 6, 1992; Committee consideration by House Energy and Commerce; Passed the House on October 6, 1992 (agreed voice vote); Passed the Senate on October 7, 1992 (passed voice vote); Signed into law by President George H. W. Bush on October 27, 1992

The Mammography Quality Standards Act (MQSA) was enacted by the United States Congress to regulate the quality of care in mammography. The act was officially effective in 1994, and was extended in 2004 to continue through 2007. The U.S. Food and Drug Administration (FDA) began inspections of mammography facilities to ensure compliance in 1995. In 1997, more comprehensive regulation was added to become effective in 1999.

The FDA explains MQSA:

The Mammography Quality Standards Act requires mammography facilities across the nation to meet uniform quality standards. Congress passed this law in 1992 to assure high-quality mammography for early breast cancer detection, which can lead to early treatment, a range of treatment options leading to an increased chance of survival. Under the law, all mammography facilities must: 1) be accredited by an FDA-approved accreditation body, 2) be certified by FDA, or its State, as meeting the standards, 3) undergo an annual MQSA inspection, and 4) prominently display the certificate issued by the agency.

== History ==
In a nationwide survey of mammography facilities conducted in 1985, called Nationwide Evaluation of X-ray Trends (NEXT), the U.S. Food and Drug Administration found 36 percent to be producing mammographic images of unacceptable quality. The FDA also found that 15 percent of facilities were using general purpose X-ray equipment for mammography. The American College of Radiology responded by initiating a voluntary accreditation program for these facilities in August 1987 and found that 30 percent of facilities failed on their first application for accreditation.

Evidence from a 1990 General Accounting Office (GAO) study showed that many mammography providers lacked adequate quality assurance programs. From June 20 to 22, 1990, NBC Nightly News correspondent Michelle Gillen presented a three-part series on the quality problems of mammography. In 1992, hearings held by the Senate Committee on Labor and Human Resources found numerous quality issues in the field of mammography.

Congress enacted the MQSA on October 7, 1992. Responsibility for implementing MQSA was delegated to the FDA by the Secretary of the U.S. Department of Health and Human Services (DHHS) on June 2, 1993. The act became effective October 1, 1994, and requires all mammography facilities to meet quality standards as promulgated by the Food and Drug Administration (FDA). The FDA published interim regulations on December 21, 1993, as a mechanism for accrediting and certifying of facilities by October 1, 1994.

The FDA found 10,142 certified facilities operating as of December 15, 1994. During the first year of MQSA, 26 percent of facilities had significant violations, while 10 percent did on the second round of inspections. On October 28, 1997, the FDA published a set of comprehensive final regulations, which become effective on April 28, 1999, guiding the accreditation process. They accredited and certified 10,161 mammography facilities as of December 31, 1997.

A 1998 estimate concluded that inspections cost each facility $1,549 annually and the average cost to reach compliance with MQSA was $18,000. Costs of meeting the interim regulations, including staff training, equipment upgrades, enhancement of quality assurance programs, and improved notification of examination results to patients, was estimated to be $24 million annually. The additional cost of facility compliance with the 1997 regulations increased this figure to $62 million annually.

The number of certified facilities operating on December 31, 1997, was about 4 percent less than prior to when MQSA went into effect on October 1, 1994. Of the 369 closures just prior to October 1, 113 could be directly attributed to MQSA.

On November 9, 1997, the Senate passed S. 537, "The Mammography Quality Standards Reauthorization Act," by unanimous consent, to reauthorize MQSA for another five years.

== Accrediting bodies ==
MQSA requires facilities to "be accredited by an FDA-approved accreditation body." Currently the only nationally-approved body is the American College of Radiology (ACR).

State-level alternatives to the ACR are the Arkansas Department of Health, Iowa Department of Public Health, and Texas Department of State Health Services.

== Effects on patients ==
MQSA is intended to maintain high quality mammography in the United States and its territories. Changes in the final regulations directly affecting regular patients include:

- Mammography facilities are required to provide patients with written results of their mammograms in language that is easy to understand. Also known as a "lay report."
- A consumer complaint mechanism is required to be established in mammography facilities to provide patients with a process for addressing their concerns.
- Patients can obtain their original mammograms, not copies, when they are needed.
- For cases in which a facility’s mammograms are determined to be substandard and a risk to public health, facilities will notify the patients and their doctors and suggest an appropriate plan of action.
- As of September 10, 2024, facilities must now include a tissue density statement informing a patient whether their breast tissue composition is considered "dense" or "not dense." Dense tissue could obscure cancers on mammography, so the aim of this statement is to make the patient aware of this and to inform them of the benefits of additional imaging.
