= Anti-malignin antibody =

Putative general antibody marker for malignant cancers

Anti-malignin antibody is a putative general antibody marker for malignant cancers, and the basis for a cancer screening test marketed by Oncolab of Boston, Mass. Initial claims for the effectiveness of the test emerged in the refereed literature in the mid-1990s.

However, the diagnostic efficacy of the test, as determined by its sensitivity and specificity has since been disputed
