= Breast cancer screening =

Testing asymptomatic women for breast cancer

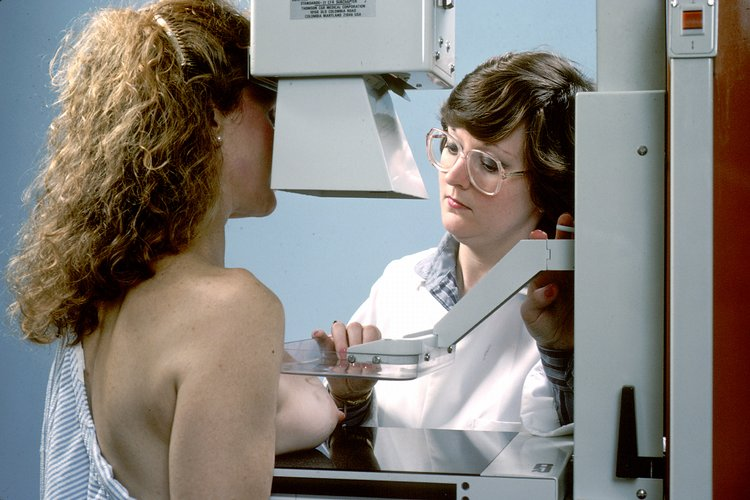
- A woman having a mammogram

Breast cancer screening is the medical screening of asymptomatic, apparently healthy women for breast cancer in an attempt to achieve an earlier diagnosis. The assumption is that early detection will improve outcomes. A number of screening tests have been employed, including clinical and self breast exams, mammography, genetic screening, ultrasound, and magnetic resonance imaging.

A clinical or self breast exam involves feeling the breast for lumps or other abnormalities. Medical evidence, however, does not support its use in women with a typical risk for breast cancer.

Universal screening with mammography is controversial as it may not reduce all-cause mortality and may cause harms through unnecessary treatments and medical procedures. Many national organizations recommend it for most older women. The United States Preventive Services Task Force recommends screening mammography in women at normal risk for breast cancer, every other year between the ages of 40 and 74. Other positions vary from no screening to starting at age 40 and screening yearly. Several tools are available to help target breast cancer screening to older women with longer life expectancies. Similar imaging studies can be performed with magnetic resonance imaging but evidence is lacking.

Earlier, more aggressive, and more frequent screening is recommended for women at particularly high risk of developing breast cancer, such as those with a confirmed BRCA mutation, those who have previously had breast cancer, and those with a strong family history of breast and ovarian cancer.

Abnormal findings on screening are further investigated by surgically removing a piece of the suspicious lumps (biopsy) to examine them under the microscope. Ultrasound may be used to guide the biopsy needle during the procedure. Magnetic resonance imaging is used to guide treatment, but is not an established screening method for healthy women.

== Breast exam ==
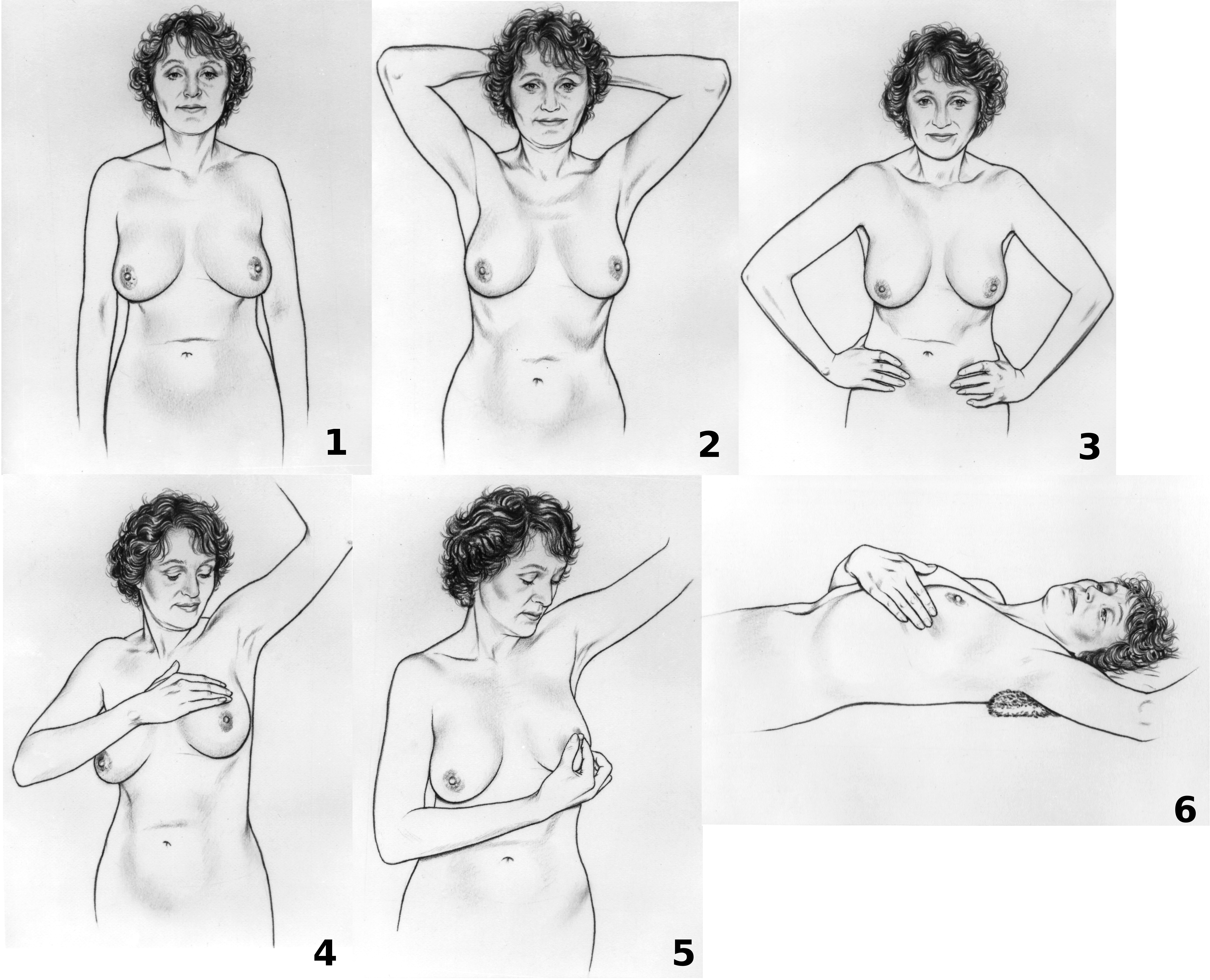
A pictorial example of breast self-examination in six steps. Steps 1-3 involve visual inspection of the breasts with the arms in different positions. Step 4 is palpation of the breast. Step 5 is palpation of the nipple. Step 6 is palpation of the breast while lying down.

Breast examinations (either clinical breast exams (CBE) by a health care provider or by self exams) are highly debated. Like mammography and other screening methods, breast examinations produce false positive results, contributing to harm. The use of screening in women without symptoms and at low risk is thus controversial.

A 2003 Cochrane review found screening by breast self-examination is not associated with lower death rates among women who report performing breast self-examination and does, like other breast cancer screening methods, increase harms, in terms of increased numbers of benign lesions identified and an increased number of biopsies performed. They conclude "at present, breast self-examination cannot be recommended". Another study done by the National Breast Cancer Foundation states that 8 out of 10 lumps found are noncancerous.

On the other hand, Lillie D. Shockney, a professor from Johns Hopkins University states, "Forty percent of diagnosed breast cancers are detected by women who feel a lump, so establishing a regular breast self-exam is very important."

There are different tactics on how to go about examining one's breasts. Doctors suggest that women use the pads of the three middle fingers and move them in circular motions starting at the center of the breast and continuing out into the armpit area. Apply different amounts of pressure while conducting the exam. Any lumps, thickenings, hardened knots, or any other breast changes should be brought to the attention of a healthcare provider. It is also important to look for changes in color or shape, nipple discharge, dimpling, and swelling.

== Mammography ==
Mammography is a common screening method, since it is relatively fast and widely available in developed countries. Mammography is a type of radiography used on the breasts. It is typically used for two purposes: to aid in the diagnosis of a woman who is experiencing symptoms or has been called back for follow-up views (called diagnostic mammography), and for medical screening of apparently healthy women (called screening mammography).

Mammography is not very useful in finding breast tumors in dense breast tissue characteristic of women under 40 years. In women over 50 without dense breasts, breast cancers detected by screening mammography are usually smaller and less aggressive than those detected by patients or doctors as a breast lump. This is because the most aggressive breast cancers are found in dense breast tissue, which mammograms perform poorly on. The European Commission's Scientific Advice Mechanism recommends that MRI scans are used in place of mammography for women with dense breast tissue.

The presumption was that by detecting cancer in an earlier stage, women will be more likely to be cured by treatment. This assertion, however, has been challenged by recent reviews which have found the significance of these net benefits to be lacking for women at average risk of dying from breast cancer.

=== Mechanism ===
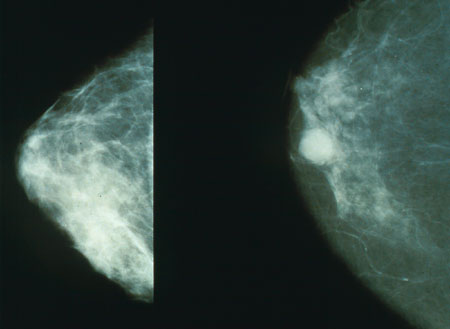
Normal (left) versus cancerous (right) mammography image.

Screening mammography is usually recommended to women who are most likely to develop breast cancer. In general, this includes women who have risk factors such as having a personal or family history of breast cancer or being older women, but not being frail elderly women, who are unlikely to benefit from treatment.

Women who agree to be screened have their breasts X-rayed on a specialized X-ray machine. This exposes the woman's breasts to a small amount of ionizing radiation, which has a very small, but non-zero, chance of causing cancer.

The X-ray image, called a radiograph, is sent to a physician who specializes in interpreting these images, called a radiologist. The image may be on plain photographic film or digital mammography on a computer screen; despite the much higher cost of the digital systems, the two methods are generally considered equally effective. The equipment may use a computer-aided diagnosis system.

There is considerable variation in interpreting the images; the same image may be declared normal by one radiologist and suspicious by another. It can be helpful to compare the images to any previously taken images, as changes over time may be significant.

If suspicious signs are identified in the image, then the woman is usually recalled for a second mammogram, sometimes after waiting six months to see whether the spot is growing, or a biopsy of the breast. Most of these will prove to be false positives, resulting in sometimes debilitating anxiety over nothing. Most women recalled will undergo additional imaging only, without any further intervention. Recall rates are higher in the U.S. than in the UK.

=== Effectiveness ===
On balance, screening mammography in older women increases medical treatment and saves a small number of lives. Usually, it has no effect on the outcome of any breast cancer that it detects. Screening targeted towards women with above-average risk produces more benefit than screening of women at average or low risk for breast cancer.

A 2013 Cochrane review estimated that mammography in women between 50 and 75 years old results in a relative decreased risk of death from breast cancer of 15% and an absolute risk reduction of 0.05%. However, when the analysis included only the least biased trials, women who had regular screening mammograms were just as likely to die from all causes, and just as likely to die specifically from breast cancer, as women who did not. The size of effect might be less in real life compared with the results in randomized controlled trials due to factors such as increased self-selection rate among women concerned and increased effectiveness of adjuvant therapies. The Nordic Cochrane Collection (2012) reviews said that advances in diagnosis and treatment might make mammography screening less effective at saving lives today. They concluded that screening is "no longer effective" at preventing deaths and "it therefore no longer seems reasonable to attend" for breast cancer screening at any age, and warn of misleading information on the internet. The review also concluded that "half or more" of cancers detected with mammography would have disappeared spontaneously without treatment. They found that most of the earliest cell changes found by mammography screening (carcinoma in situ) should be left alone because these changes would not have progressed into invasive cancer.

The accidental harm from screening mammography has been underestimated. Women who have mammograms end up with increased surgeries, chemotherapy, radiotherapy and other potentially procedures resulting from the over-detection of harmless lumps. Many women will experience important psychological distress for many months because of false positive findings. Half of suspicious findings will not become dangerous or will disappear over time. Consequently, the value of routine mammography in women at low or average risk is controversial. With unnecessary treatment of ten women for every one woman whose life was prolonged, the authors concluded that routine mammography may do more harm than good. If 1,000 women in their 50s are screened every year for ten years, the following outcomes are considered typical in the developed world:

- One woman's life will be extended due to earlier detection of breast cancer.
- 2 to 10 women will be overdiagnosed and needlessly treated for cancer that would have stopped growing on its own or otherwise caused no harm during the woman's lifetime.
- 5 to 15 women will be treated for breast cancer, with the same outcome as if cancer had been detected after symptoms appeared.
- 500 will be incorrectly told they might have breast cancer (false positive).
- 125 to 250 will undergo breast biopsy.

The outcomes are worse for women in their 20s, 30s, and 40s, as they are far less likely to have a life-threatening breast cancer, and more likely to have dense breasts that make interpreting the mammogram more difficult. Among women in their 60s, who have a somewhat higher rate of breast cancer, the proportion of positive outcomes to harms are better:

- For women in their 40s: About 2,000 women would need to be screened every year for 10 years to prevent one death from breast cancer. 1,000 of these women would experience false positives, and 250 healthy women would undergo unnecessary biopsies.
- For women in their 50s: About 1,350 women would need to be screened for every year for 10 years to prevent one death from breast cancer. Half of these women would experience false positives, and one-quarter would undergo unnecessary biopsies.
- For women in their 60s: About 375 women would need to be screened for every year for 10 years to prevent one death from breast cancer. Half of these women would experience false positives, and one-quarter would undergo unnecessary biopsies.

Mammography is not generally considered as an effective screening technique for women at average or low risk of developing cancer who are less than 50 years old. For normal-risk women 40 to 49 years of age, the risks of mammography outweigh the benefits, and the US Preventive Services Task Force says that the evidence in favor of routine screening of women under the age of 50 is "weak". Part of the difficulty in interpreting mammograms in younger women stems from breast density. Radiographically, a dense breast has a preponderance of glandular tissue, and younger age or estrogen hormone replacement therapy contribute to mammographic breast density. After menopause, the breast glandular tissue gradually is replaced by fatty tissue, making mammographic interpretation much more accurate.

=== Recommendations ===
Recommendations to attend to mammography screening vary across countries and organizations, with the most common difference being the age at which screening should begin, and how frequently or if it should be performed, among women at typical risk for developing breast cancer.

In England, all women were invited for screening once every three years beginning at age 50. There is a trial in progress to assess the risks and benefits of offering screening to women aged 47 to 49. Some other organizations recommend mammograms begin as early as age 40 in normal-risk women, and take place more frequently, up to once each year. Women at higher risk may benefit from earlier or more frequent screening. Women with one or more first-degree relatives (mother, sister, daughter) with premenopausal breast cancer often begin screening at an earlier age, perhaps at an age 10 years younger than the age when the relative was diagnosed with breast cancer.

As of 2009 the United States Preventive Services Task Force recommends that women over the age of 50 receive mammography once every two years.

In March 2022, the European Commission's Scientific Advice Mechanism recommended extending screening to women in their mid-40s.

The Cochrane Collaboration (2013) states that the best quality evidence neither demonstrates a reduction in either cancer specific, nor a reduction in all-cause mortality from screening mammography. When less rigorous trials are added to the analysis there is a reduction in breast cancer specific mortality of 0.05% (a relative decrease of 15%). Screening results in a 30% increase in rates of over-diagnosis and over-treatment, resulting in the view that it is not clear whether mammography screening does more good or harm. On their Web site, Cochrane currently concludes that, due to recent improvements in breast cancer treatment, and the risks of false positives from breast cancer screening leading to unnecessary treatment, "it therefore no longer seems reasonable to attend for breast cancer screening" at any age.

=== Breast density ===
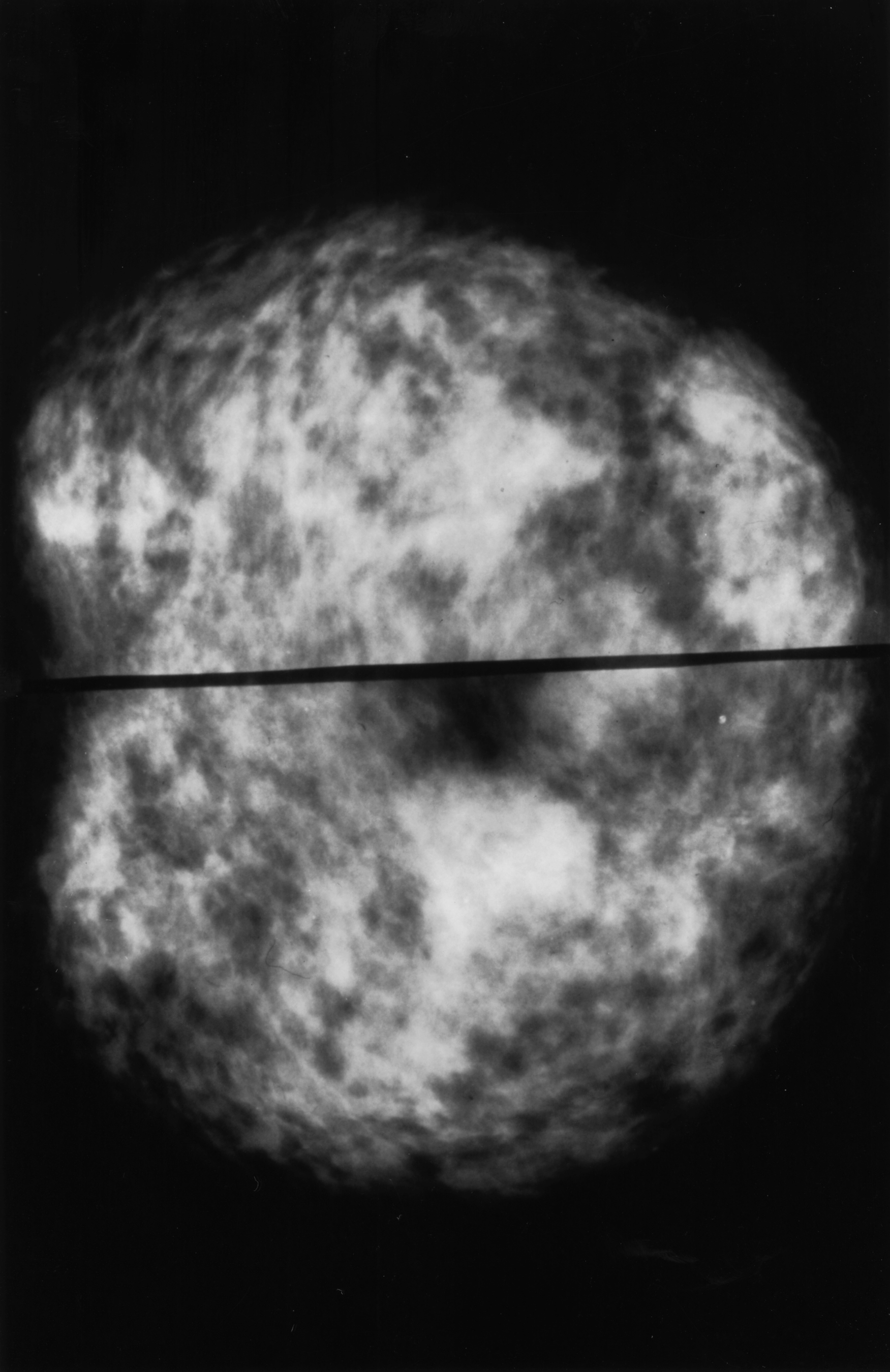
Two mammograms of normal dense breasts.

Breasts are made up of breast tissue, connective tissue, and adipose (fat) tissue. The amount of each of the three types of tissue varies from person to person. Breast density is a measurement of relative amounts of these three tissues in breasts, as determined by their appearance on an X-ray image. Breast and connective tissues are radiographically denser (they produce a brighter white on an X-ray) than adipose tissue on a mammogram, so a person with more breast tissue and/or more connective tissue is said to have greater breast density. Breast density is assessed by mammography and expressed as a percentage of the mammogram occupied by radiologically dense tissue (percent mammographic density or PMD). About half of middle-aged women have dense breasts, and breasts generally become less dense as they age. Higher breast density is an independent risk factor for breast cancer. Further, breast cancers are difficult to detect through mammograms in women with high breast density because most cancers and dense breast tissues have a similar appearance on a mammogram. As a result, higher breast density is associated with a higher rate of false negatives (missed cancers). Because of the importance of breast density as a risk indicator and as a measure of diagnostic accuracy, automated methods have been developed to facilitate assessment and reporting for mammography, and tomosynthesis.

=== Health programs ===
==== United States ====
In 2005, about 68% of all U.S. women age 40–64 had a mammogram in the past two years (75% of women with private health insurance, 56% of women with Medicaid insurance, 38% of currently uninsured women, and 33% of women uninsured for more than 12 months). All U.S. states except Utah require private health insurance plans and Medicaid to pay for breast cancer screening. As of 1998, Medicare (available to those aged 65 or older or who have been on Social Security Disability Insurance for over 2 years) pays for annual screening mammography in women aged 40 or older.

==== Canada ====
Three out of twelve (3/12) breast cancer screening programs in Canada offer clinical breast examinations. All twelve offer screening mammography every two years for women aged 50–69, while nine out of twelve (9/12) offer screening mammography for women aged 40–49. In 2003, about 61% of women aged 50–69 in Canada reported having had a mammogram within the past two years.

==== United Kingdom ====
The UK's NHS Breast Screening Programme, the first of its kind in the world, began in 1988 and achieved national coverage in the mid-1990s. It provides free breast cancer screening mammography every three years for all women in the UK aged from 50 and up to their 71st birthday. The NHS Breast Screening Programme is supporting a research study trial to assess the risks (i.e. the chances of being diagnosed and treated for a non-life-threatening cancer) and benefits (i.e. the chances of saving life) in women aged 47 to 49 and 71 to 73 (Public Health England 2017).

As of 2006, about 76% of women aged 53–64 resident in England had been screened at least once in the previous three years. However a 2016 UK-based study has also highlighted that the uptake of breast cancer screening among women living with severe mental illness (SMI) is lower than patients of the same age in the same population, without SMI. In Northern Ireland women with mental health problems were shown to be less likely to attend screening for breast cancer, than women without. The lower attendance numbers remained the same even when marital status and social deprivation were taken into account. People from minority ethnic communities are also less likely to attend cancer screening. In the UK, women of South Asian heritage are the least likely to attend breast cancer screening.

After information technology problems affected the recall system in England an internal inquiry by Public Health England and an independent inquiry were established and the National Audit Office started an investigation.

==== Australia ====
The Australian national breast screening program, BreastScreen Australia, was commenced in the early 1990s and invites women aged 50–74 to screening every 2 years. No routine clinical examination is performed, and the cost of screening is free to the point of diagnosis.

==== Singapore ====
The Singapore national breast screening program, BreastScreen Singapore, started in 2002. It is the only publicly funded national breast screening program in Asia and enrolls women aged 50–64 for screening every two years. Like the Australian system, no clinical examination is performed routinely. Unlike most national screening systems, however, clients have to pay half of the cost of the screening mammogram; this is in line with the Singapore health system's core principle of co-payment for all health services.

=== Criticisms ===
Most women significantly overestimate both their own risk of dying from breast cancer and the effect screening mammography could have on it. Some researchers worry that if women correctly understood that screening programs offer a small, but statistically significant benefit, more women would refuse to participate.

The contribution of mammography to the early diagnosis of cancer is controversial, and for those found with benign lesions, mammography can create a high psychological and financial cost. Most women participating in mammography screening programs accept the risk of false positive recall, and the majority do not find it very distressing. Many patients find the recall very frightening, and are intensely relieved to discover that it was a false positive, as about 90% of women do.

A major effect of routine breast screening is to greatly increase the rate of early breast cancer detection, in particular for non-invasive ductal carcinoma in situ, sometimes called "pre-breast cancer", which almost never forms a lump and which generally cannot be detected except through mammography. While this ability to detect such very early breast malignancies is at the heart of claims that screening mammography can improve survival from breast cancer, it is also controversial. This is because a very large proportion of such cases will not progress to kill the patient, and thus mammography cannot be genuinely claimed to have saved any lives in such cases; in fact, it would lead to increased sickness and unnecessary surgery for such patients.

Consequently, finding and treating many cases of ductal carcinoma in situ represents overdiagnosis and overtreatment. Treatment is given to all women with ductal carcinoma in situ because it is currently impossible to predict who will have an indolent, non-fatal course, and which few will progress to invasive cancer and premature death if left untreated. Consequently, all patients with ductal carcinoma in situ are treated in much the same way, with at least wide local excision, and sometimes mastectomy if it is very extensive. The cure rate for ductal carcinoma in situ if treated appropriately is extremely high, partly because the majority of cases were harmless in the first place.

The phenomenon of finding pre-invasive malignancy or nonmalignant benign disease is commonplace in all forms of cancer screening, including pap smears for cervical cancer, fecal occult blood testing for colon cancer, and prostate-specific antigen testing for prostate cancer. All of these tests have the potential to detect asymptomatic cancers, and all of them have a high rate of false positives and lead to invasive procedures that are unlikely to benefit the patient.

== Risk-based screening ==
Risk-based screening uses risk assessment of a woman's five-year and lifetime risk of developing breast cancer to issue personalized screening recommendations of when to start, stop, and how often to screen. In general, women with low risk are recommended to screen less frequently, while screening is intensified in those at high risk. The NCI (National Cancer Institute) provides a free breast cancer risk assessment tool online that utilizes the Gail Model to predict risk of developing invasive breast cancer based on a woman's personal information. This tool has been found to underestimate the risk of breast cancer in non-white women. The hypothesis is that focusing screening on women most likely to develop invasive breast cancer will reduce overdiagnosis and overtreatment.

The Wisdom Study, (Note: The ClinicalTrials.gov Identifier for the Wisdom Study is: NCT02620852. The official website for this study is: www.thewisdomstudy.org/) currently ongoing in California as of March 2025, is first clinical trial testing the safety and efficacy of risk-based screening compared to annual screening.

== Molecular breast imaging ==
Molecular breast imaging is a nuclear medicine technique that is currently under study. It shows promising results for imaging people with dense breast tissue and may have accuracies comparable to MRI. It may be better than mammography in some people with dense breast tissue, detecting two to three times more cancers in this population. It however carries a greater risk of radiation damage making it inappropriate for general breast cancer screening. It is possible to reduce the dose of radiation used.

An earlier alternative technique suited to dense breast tissue, scintimammography is now not recommended by the American Cancer Society, which states, "This test cannot show whether an abnormal area is cancer as accurately as a mammogram, and it's not used as a screening test. Some radiologists believe this test may be helpful in looking at suspicious areas found by mammogram. But the exact role of scintimammography is still unclear."

== Ultrasonography ==
Medical ultrasonography is a diagnostic aid to mammography. Adding ultrasonography testing for women with dense breast tissue increases the detection of breast cancer, but also increases false positives. Ultrasonography is indicated in women under 40–45 years old that present signs such as: palpable lump on breast or axillary area, skin retraction or discharge from the nipples. It can also be used in pregnant or lactating women.

The ultrasonography is the preferred method for individuals who need repeated scans over a certain period of time due to the lack of ionizing radiation. Disadvantages include a low ability to detect microcalcifications, a possible early sign of cancer.

== Contrast-enhanced mammography ==
Contrast-enhanced mammography is an advanced imaging technique that employs iodinated contrast agents to visualize breast neovascularization, functioning similarly to magnetic resonance imaging. Tumor-associated angiogenesis often results in leaky blood vessels, allowing contrast material to accumulate within the tumor tissue and produce an iodine-enhanced image. This enhances the visibility of malignancies that might otherwise be obscured by dense breast tissue. Contrast-enhanced mammography is also referred to as contrast-enhanced spectral mammography, contrast-enhanced digital mammography, or contrast-enhanced dual-energy mammography.

A large randomized controlled trial published in The Lancet in 2025 found that contrast-enhanced mammography detects significantly more invasive breast cancers in women with dense breast tissue than standard mammography or ultrasound. Conducted across 10 U.K. screening sites with over 9,000 participants, the study reported that contrast-enhanced mammography identified 15.7 invasive cancers per 1,000 exams, compared to 4.2 for ultrasound and 15 for MRI, with no statistically significant difference between contrast-enhanced mammography and MRI. Contrast-enhanced mammography was also found to be more cost-effective and accessible than MRI. Advocates suggest contrast-enhanced mammography could improve early detection and outcomes for women with dense breasts, but acknowledge risks of overdiagnosis.

== Magnetic resonance imaging ==
Magnetic resonance imaging (MRI) has been shown to detect cancers not visible on mammograms. The chief strength of breast MRI is its very high negative predictive value. A negative MRI can rule out the presence of cancer to a high degree of certainty, making it an excellent tool for screening in patients at high genetic risk or radiographically dense breasts, and for pre-treatment staging where the extent of disease is difficult to determine on mammography and ultrasound. MRI can diagnose benign proliferative change, fibroadenomas, and other common benign findings at a glance, often eliminating the need for costly and unnecessary biopsies or surgical procedures. The spatial and temporal resolution of breast MRI has increased markedly in recent years, making it possible to detect or rule out the presence of small in situ cancers, including ductal carcinoma in situ.

Despite the aids provided from MRIs, there are some disadvantages. For example, although it is 27–36% more sensitive, it has been claimed to be less specific than mammography. As a result, MRI studies may have up to 30% more false positives, which may have undesirable financial and psychological costs on the patient. Also, MRI procedures are expensive and include an intravenous injection of a gadolinium contrast, which has been implicated in a rare reaction called nephrogenic systemic fibrosis. Other patients with a history of renal failure/disease are not able to undergo MRI scans. Breast MRI is not recommended for screening all breast cancer patients, yet limited to patients with high risk of developing breast cancer that may have high familial risk or mutations in BCRA1/2 genes. Breast MRI is not a perfect tool despite its increased sensitivity for detecting breast cancer masses when compared to mammography. This due to the ability of MRIs to miss some cancers that would have been detected with conventional mammography. As a result, MRI screening for breast cancer is most effective as a combination with other tests and for certain breast cancer patients. In contrast, the use of MRIs are often limiting to patients with any body metal integration such as patients with tattoos, pacemakers, tissue expanders, and so on.

Proposed indications for using MRI for screening include:

- Strong family history of breast cancer
- Patients with BRCA-1 or BRCA-2 oncogene mutations
- Evaluation of women with breast implants
- History of previous lumpectomy or breast biopsy surgeries
- Axillary metastasis with an unknown primary tumor
- Very dense or scarred breast tissue

In addition, breast MRI may be helpful for screening in women who have had breast augmentation procedures involving intramammary injections of various foreign substances that may mask the appearances of breast cancer on mammography and/or ultrasound. These substances include silicone oil and polyacrylamide gel.

== BRCA testing ==
Genetic testing does not detect cancers, but may reveal a propensity to develop cancer. Women who are known to have a higher risk of developing breast cancer usually undertake more aggressive screening programs. However, research has shown that genetic screening needs to be adapted for use in women from different ethnic groups. A study in the UK found that two established risk scores – called SNP18 and SNP143 – are inaccurate and exaggerate risk in Black, Asian, mixed-race and Ashkenazi Jewish women.

A clinical practice guideline by the US Preventive Services Task Force recommends against routine referral for genetic counseling or routine testing for BRCA mutations, on fair evidence that the harms outweigh the benefits. It also encourages a referral for counseling and testing in women who have a family history that indicates they have an increased risk of a BRCA mutation, on fair evidence of benefit. About 2% of American women have family histories that indicate an increased risk of having a medically significant BRCA mutation.

== Other ==
- The nipple aspirate test is not indicated for breast cancer screening.
- Optical imaging, also known as diaphanography (DPG), multi-scan transillumination, and light scanning, is the use of transillumination to distinguish tissue variations. It is in the early stage of study.
- A test of anti-malignin antibody in serum has been studied for breast cancer screening with mixed results.
