= Mammography =

Use of low-energy X-rays to examine the human breast

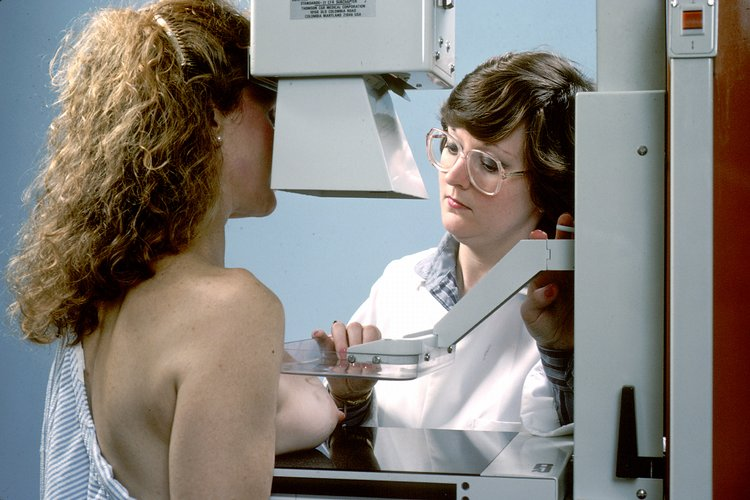
- Mammography
- Other names: Mastography
- ICD-10-PCS: BH0
- ICD-9-CM: 87.37
- MeSH: D008327
- OPS-301 code: 3–10
- MedlinePlus: 003380

Mammography (also called mastography; DICOM modality: MG) is the process of using low-energy X-rays (usually around 30 kVp) to examine the human breast for diagnosis and screening. The goal of mammography is the early detection of breast cancer, typically through detection of characteristic masses, microcalcifications, asymmetries, and distortions.

As with all X-rays, mammograms use doses of ionizing radiation to create images. These images are then analyzed for abnormal findings. It is usual to employ lower-energy X-rays, typically Mo (K-shell X-ray energies of 17.5 and 19.6 keV) and Rh (20.2 and 22.7 keV) than those used for radiography of bones. Mammography may be 2D or 3D (tomosynthesis), depending on the available equipment or purpose of the examination. Ultrasound, ductography, positron emission mammography (PEM), and magnetic resonance imaging (MRI) are adjuncts to mammography. Ultrasound is typically used for further evaluation of masses found on mammography or palpable masses that may or may not be seen on mammograms. Ductograms are still used in some institutions for evaluation of bloody nipple discharge when a mammogram is non-diagnostic. MRI can be useful for the screening of high-risk patients, for further evaluation of questionable findings or symptoms, as well as for pre-surgical evaluation of patients with known breast cancer, in order to detect additional lesions that might change the surgical approach (for example, from breast-conserving lumpectomy to mastectomy).

In 2023, the U.S. Preventive Services Task Force issued a final recommendation statement that all women should receive a screening mammography every two years from age 40 to 74. The American College of Radiology, Society of Breast Imaging, and American Cancer Society recommend yearly screening mammography starting at age 40. The Canadian Task Force on Preventive Health Care (2012) and the European Cancer Observatory (2011) recommend mammography every 2 to 3 years between ages 50 and 69. These task force reports point out that in addition to unnecessary surgery and anxiety, the risks of more frequent mammograms include a small but significant increase in breast cancer induced by radiation. Additionally, mammograms should not be performed with increased frequency in patients undergoing breast surgery, including breast enlargement, mastopexy, and breast reduction.

== Types ==
=== Digital ===
Digital mammography is a specialized form of mammography that uses digital receptors and computers instead of X-ray film to help examine breast tissue for breast cancer. The electrical signals can be read on computer screens, permitting more manipulation of images to allow radiologists to view the results more clearly. The standard digital mammography is "full field" (FFDM), in which the entire breast is imaged in a single view. Digital mammography can also include the use of "spot views", in which a paddle is used to further compress areas of concern.

Digital mammography is also utilized in stereotactic biopsy. Breast biopsy may also be performed using a different modality, such as ultrasound or magnetic resonance imaging (MRI).

While radiologists had hoped for more marked improvement, the effectiveness of digital mammography was found comparable to traditional X-ray methods in 2004, though there may be reduced radiation with the technique and it may lead to fewer retests. Specifically, it performs no better than film for post-menopausal women, who represent more than three-quarters of women with breast cancer. The U.S. Preventive Services Task Force concluded that there was insufficient evidence to recommend for or against digital mammography over basic film mammography for breast cancer screening.

Digital mammography is a NASA spin-off, utilizing technology developed for the Hubble Space Telescope. As of 2022, over 99% of certified mammography centers in the United States screening centers use digital mammography. Globally, systems by Fujifilm Corporation are the most widely used. In the United States, GE's digital imaging units typically cost US$300,000 to $500,000, far more than film-based imaging systems. Costs may decline as GE begins to compete with the less expensive Fuji systems.

=== 3D mammography ===
Three-dimensional mammography, also known as digital breast tomosynthesis (DBT), tomosynthesis, and 3D breast imaging, is a mammogram technology that creates a 3D view of the breast using X-rays from different angles. Supplementing standard 2D mammography with DBT has been shown to improve cancer detection. Cost effectiveness is unclear as of 2016. Another concern is that it more than doubles the radiation exposure.

=== Contrast-enhanced mammography ===
Contrast-enhanced mammography is an advanced imaging technique that employs iodinated contrast agents to visualize breast neovascularization, functioning similarly to magnetic resonance imaging. Tumor-associated angiogenesis often results in leaky blood vessels, allowing contrast material to accumulate within the tumor tissue and produce an iodine-enhanced image. This enhances the visibility of malignancies that might otherwise be obscured by dense breast tissue. Contrast-enhanced mammography is also referred to as contrast-enhanced spectral mammography, contrast-enhanced digital mammography, or contrast-enhanced dual-energy mammography.

A large randomized controlled trial published in The Lancet in 2025 found that contrast-enhanced mammography detects significantly more invasive breast cancers in women with dense breast tissue than standard mammography or ultrasound. Conducted across 10 U.K. screening sites with over 9,000 participants, the study reported that contrast-enhanced mammography identified 15.7 invasive cancers per 1,000 exams, compared to 4.2 for ultrasound and 15 for MRI, with no statistically significant difference between Contrast-enhanced mammography and MRI. CEM was also found to be more cost-effective and accessible than MRI. Advocates suggest contrast-enhanced mammography could improve early detection and outcomes for women with dense breasts, but acknowledge risks of overdiagnosis.

=== Photon counting ===
Photon-counting mammography was introduced commercially in 2003 and was shown to reduce the X-ray dose to the patient by approximately 40% compared to conventional methods while maintaining image quality at an equal or higher level. The technology was subsequently developed to enable spectral imaging with the possibility to further improve image quality, to distinguish between different tissue types, and to measure breast density.

=== Galactography ===
A galactography (or breast ductography) is a now infrequently used type of mammography used to visualize the milk ducts. Prior to the mammography itself, a radiopaque substance is injected into the duct system. This test is indicated when nipple discharge exists.

== Medical uses ==
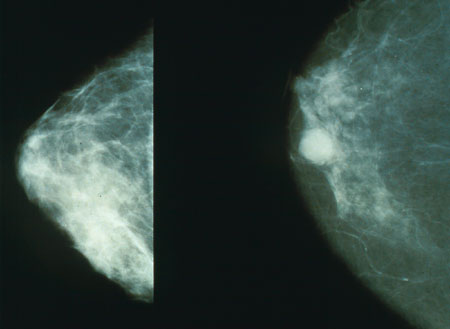
Normal (left) versus cancerous (right) mammography image

Mammography can detect cancer early when it is most treatable and can be treated less invasively (thereby helping to preserve quality of life).

According to National Cancer Institute data, since mammography screening became widespread in the mid-1980s, the U.S. breast cancer death rate, unchanged for the previous 50 years, has dropped well over 30 percent. In European countries like Denmark and Sweden, where mammography screening programs are more organized, the breast cancer death rate has been cut almost in half over the last 20 years.

Mammography screening cuts the risk of dying from breast cancer nearly in half. A recent study published in Cancer showed that more than 70 percent of the women who died from breast cancer in their 40s at major Harvard teaching hospitals were among the 20 percent of women who were not being screened. Some scientific studies have shown that the most lives are saved by screening beginning at age 40.

A recent study in the British Medical Journal shows that early detection of breast cancer – as with mammography – significantly improves breast cancer survival.

The benefits of mammography screening at decreasing breast cancer mortality in randomized trials are not found in observational studies performed long after implementation of breast cancer screening programs (for instance, Bleyer et al.)

== When to start screening ==
In 2014, the Surveillance, Epidemiology, and End Results Program of the National Institutes of Health reported the occurrence rates of breast cancer based on 1000 women in different age groups. In the 40–44 age group, the incidence was 1.5 and in the 45–49 age group, the incidence was 2.3. In the older age groups, the incidence was 2.7 in the 50–54 age group and 3.2 in the 55–59 age group.

While screening between ages 40 and 50 is somewhat controversial, the majority of the evidence indicates that there is a benefit in terms of early detection. Currently, the American Cancer Society, the American Congress of Obstetricians and Gynecologists (ACOG), the American College of Radiology, and the Society of Breast Imaging encourage annual mammograms beginning at age 40.

The National Cancer Institute encourages mammograms every one to two years for women ages 40 to 49. In 2023, United States Preventive Services Task Force (USPSTF) revised the recommendation that women and transgender men undergo biennial mammograms starting at the age of 40, rather than the previously suggested age of 50. This adjustment is prompted by the increasing incidence of breast cancer in the 40 to 49 age group over the past decade.

In contrast, the American College of Physicians, a large internal medicine group, has recently encouraged individualized screening plans as opposed to wholesale biannual screening of women aged 40 to 49. The American Cancer Society recommendations for women at average risk for breast cancer is a yearly mammogram from age 45 to 54 with an optional yearly mammogram from age 40 to 44.

== Screening for high-risk population ==
Women who are at high risk for early-onset breast cancer have separate recommendations for screening. These include those who:

- Have a known BRCA1 or BRCA2 gene mutation.
- Have a 1st-degree relative (parent, brother, sister, or child), 2nd-degree relative (aunts, uncles, nieces, or grandparents), or 3rd-degree relative with a known BRCA1 or BRCA2 gene mutation.
- Have a lifetime risk of breast cancer >20% according to risk assessment tools
- History of radiation therapy to chest between 10 and 30 years of age
- Have or has a 1st-degree relative with a genetic syndrome including Li–Fraumeni syndrome, Cowden syndrome, or Bannayan–Riley–Ruvalcaba syndrome

The American College of Radiology recommends these individuals to get annual mammography starting at the age of 30. Those with a history of chest radiation therapy before age 30 should start annually at age 25 or 8 years after their latest therapy (whichever is latest). The American Cancer Society also recommends women at high risk should get a mammogram and breast MRI every year beginning at age 30 or an age recommended by their healthcare provider.

The National Comprehensive Cancer Network advocates screening for women who possess a BRCA1 or BRCA2 mutation or have a first-degree relative with such a mutation, even in the absence of the patient being tested for BRCA1/2 mutations. For women at high risk, the network recommends undergoing an annual mammogram and breast MRI between the ages of 25 and 40, considering the specific gene mutation type or the youngest age of breast cancer occurrence in the family. Additionally, the network suggests that high-risk women undergo clinical breast exams every 6 to 12 months starting at age 25. These individuals should also engage in discussions with healthcare providers to assess the advantages and disadvantages of 3D mammography and acquire knowledge on detecting changes in their breasts.

== Adverse effects ==
=== Radiation ===
The radiation exposure associated with mammography is a potential risk of screening, which appears to be greater in younger women. In scans where women receive 0.25–20 Gray (Gy) of radiation, they have more of an elevated risk of developing breast cancer. A study of radiation risk from mammography concluded that for women 40 years of age and older, the risk of radiation-induced breast cancer was minuscule, particularly compared with the potential benefit of mammographic screening, with a benefit-to-risk ratio of 48.5 lives saved for each life lost due to radiation exposure. This also correlates to a decrease in breast cancer mortality rates by 24%.

=== Pain ===
The mammography procedure can be painful. Reported pain rates range from 6–76%, with 23–95% experiencing pain or discomfort. Experiencing pain is a significant predictor in women not re-attending screening. There are few proven interventions to reduce pain in mammography, but evidence suggests that giving women information about the mammography procedure prior to it taking place may reduce the pain and discomfort experienced. Furthermore, research has found that standardised compression levels can help to reduce patients' pain while still allowing for optimal diagnostic images to be produced.

== Procedure ==
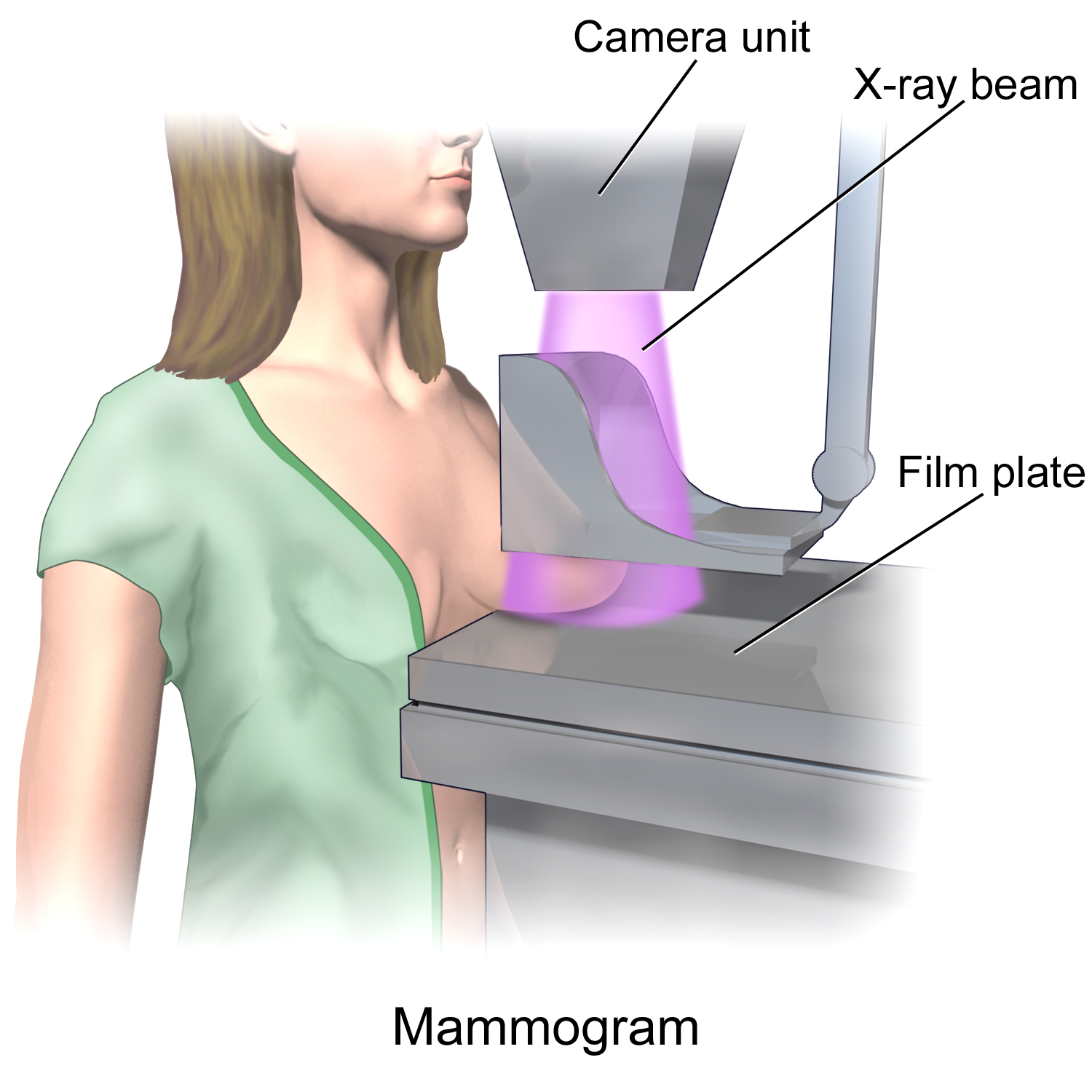
Illustration of a mammogram

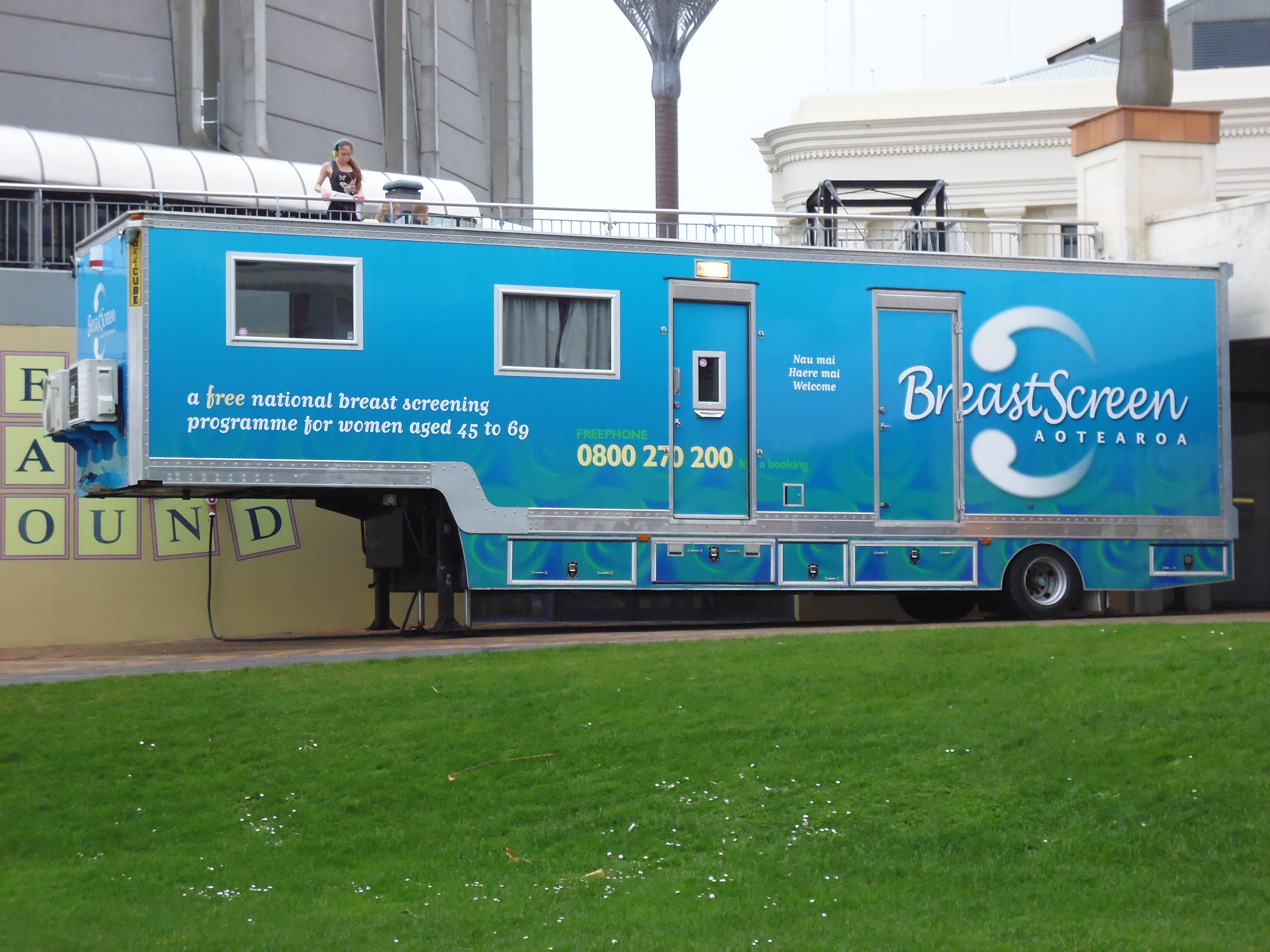
A mobile mammography unit in New Zealand

During the procedure, the breast is compressed using a dedicated mammography unit. Parallel-plate compression evens out the thickness of breast tissue to increase image quality by reducing the thickness of tissue that X-rays must penetrate, decreasing the amount of scattered radiation (scatter degrades image quality), reducing the required radiation dose, and holding the breast still (preventing motion blur). In screening mammography, both head-to-foot (craniocaudal, CC) view and angled side-view (mediolateral oblique, MLO) images of the breast are taken. Diagnostic mammography may include these and other views, including geometrically magnified and spot-compressed views of the particular area of concern. Deodorant, talcum powder or lotion may show up on the X-ray as calcium spots, so women are discouraged from applying them on the day of their exam. There are two types of mammogram studies: screening mammograms and diagnostic mammograms. Screening mammograms, consisting of four standard X-ray images, are performed yearly on patients who present with no symptoms. Diagnostic mammograms are reserved for patients with breast symptoms (such as palpable lumps, breast pain, skin changes, nipple changes, or nipple discharge), as follow-up for probably benign findings (coded BI-RADS 3), or for further evaluation of abnormal findings seen on their screening mammograms. Diagnostic mammograms may also performed on patients with personal or family histories of breast cancer. Patients with breast implants and other stable benign surgical histories generally do not require diagnostic mammograms.

Until some years ago, mammography was typically performed with screen-film cassettes. Today, mammography is undergoing transition to digital detectors, known as digital mammography or Full Field Digital Mammography (FFDM). The first FFDM system was approved by the FDA in the U.S. in 2000. This progress is occurring some years later than in general radiology. This is due to several factors:

1. The higher spatial resolution demands of mammography
2. Significantly increased expense of the equipment
3. Concern by the FDA that digital mammography equipment demonstrate that it is at least as good as screen-film mammography at detecting breast cancers without increasing dose or the number of women recalled for further evaluation.

As of March 1, 2010, 62% of facilities in the United States and its territories have at least one FFDM unit. (The FDA includes computed radiography units in this figure.)

Tomosynthesis, otherwise known as 3D mammography, was first introduced in clinical trials in 2008 and has been Medicare-approved in the United States since 2015. As of 2023, 3D mammography has become widely available in the US and has been shown to have improved sensitivity and specificity over 2D mammography.

Mammograms are either looked at by one (single reading) or two (double reading) trained professionals: these film readers are generally radiologists, but may also be radiographers, radiotherapists, or breast clinicians (non-radiologist physicians specializing in breast disease).

Double reading significantly improves the sensitivity and specificity of the procedure, and is standard practice in the United Kingdom, but not in the United States as it is not reimbursed by Medicare or private health insurance. This is despite multiple trials showing increased accuracy of detection and improved patient outcomes for both morbidity and mortality when double reading is employed. Clinical decision support systems may be used with digital mammography (or digitized images from analogue mammography), but studies suggest these approaches do not significantly improve performance or provide only a small improvement.

=== Interpretation of results ===
==== BI-RADS ====
Stratification for breast cancer risk on a mammogram is based on a reporting system known as Breast Imaging-Reporting and Data System (BI-RADS), developed by the American College of Radiology in 1993. It has five general categories of findings: mass, asymmetry, architectural distortion, calcifications, and associated features.

The use of language with BI-RADS is extremely precise, with a limited set of permissible adjectives for lesion margins, shape and internal density, each of which carries a different prognostic significance. Margins of a lesion, for example, can only be described as circumscribed, obscured, micropapillary, indistinct or stellate. Similarly, shape can only be round, oval or irregular. Each of these agreed upon adjectives is referred to as a "descriptor" in the BI-RADS lexicon, with specific positive and negative predictive values for breast cancer with each word. Additionally, each BI-RADS category corresponds with a probability of cancer. This fastiduous attention to semantics with BI-RADS allows for standardization of cancer detection across different treatment centers and imaging modalities.

After describing the findings, the radiologist provides a final assessment ranging from 0 to 6:

- BI-RADS 0 indicates an incomplete assessment which needs additional imaging.
- BI-RADS 1 and 2 indicate a negative and benign screen mammogram respectively.
- BI-RADS 3 indicates probably benign.
- BI-RADS 4 indicates suspicious for malignancy.
- BI-RADS 5 indicates highly suggestive of malignancy.
- BI-RADS 6 is for biopsy-proven breast cancer.

BI-RADS 3, 4 and 5 assessments on screening mammograms require further investigation with a second "diagnostic" study. The latter is a more detailed mammogram that allows dedicated attention to the abnormal finding with additional maneuvers such as magnification, rolling of breast tissue or exaggerated positioning. There may also be imaging with ultrasound at this time, which carries its own parallel BI-RADS lexicon. Suspicious lesions are then biopsied with local anesthesia or proceed straight to surgery depending on their staging. Biopsy can be done with the help of x-rays or ultrasound, depending on which imaging modality shows the lesion best.

In the UK mammograms are scored on a scale from 1–5 (1 = normal, 2 = benign, 3 = indeterminate, 4 = suspicious of malignancy, 5 = malignant). Evidence suggests that accounting for genetic risk, factors improve breast cancer risk prediction.

== History ==
As a medical procedure that induces ionizing radiation, the origin of mammography can be traced to the discovery of X-rays by Wilhelm Röntgen in 1895.

In 1913, German surgeon Albert Salomon performed a mammography study on 3,000 mastectomies, comparing X-rays of the breasts to the actual removed tissue, observing specifically microcalcifications. By doing so, he was able to establish the difference as seen on an X-ray image between cancerous and non-cancerous tumors in the breast. Salomon's mammographs provided substantial information about the spread of tumors and their borders.

In 1930, American physician and radiologist Stafford L. Warren published "A Roentgenologic Study of the Breast", a study where he produced stereoscopic X-rays images to track changes in breast tissue as a result of pregnancy and mastitis. In 119 women who subsequently underwent surgery, he correctly found breast cancer in 54 out of 58 cases.

As early as 1937, Jacob Gershon-Cohen developed a form a mammography for a diagnostic of breast cancer at earlier stages to improve survival rates.

In 1949, Uruguayan radiologist es:Raúl Leborgne sparked renewed enthusiasm for mammography by emphasizing the importance of technical proficiency in patient positioning and the adoption of specific radiological parameters. He played a pioneering role in elevating imaging quality while placing particular emphasis on distinguishing between benign and malignant calcifications. In the early 1950s, Leborgne developed the breast compression technique to produce better quality images, and described the differences between benign and malign microcalcifications.

In 1956, Gershon-Cohen conducted clinical trails on over 1,000 asymptomatic women at the Albert Einstein Medical Center on his screening technique, and the same year, Robert Egan at the University of Texas M.D. Anderson Cancer Center combined a technique of low kVp with high mA and single emulsion films developed by Kodak to devise a method of screening mammography. He published these results in 1959 in a paper, subsequently vulgarized in a 1964 book called Mammography. The "Egan technique", as it became known, enabled physicians to detect calcification in breast tissue; of the 245 breast cancers that were confirmed by biopsy among 1,000 patients, Egan and his colleagues at M.D. Anderson were able to identify 238 cases by using his method, 19 of which were in patients whose physical examinations had revealed no breast pathology.

Use of mammography as a screening technique spread clinically after a 1966 study demonstrating the impact of mammograms on mortality and treatment led by Philip Strax. This study, based in New York, was the first large-scale randomized controlled trial of mammography screening.

In 1985, László Tabár and colleagues documented findings from mammographic screening involving 134,867 women aged 40 to 79. Using a single mediolateral oblique image, they reported a 31% reduction in mortality. Dr. Tabár has since written many publications promoting mammography in the areas of epidemiology, screening, early diagnosis, and clinical-radiological-pathological correlation.

== Arguments against screening mammography ==
The use of mammography as a screening tool for the detection of early breast cancer in otherwise healthy women without symptoms is seen by some as controversial.

Keen and Keen indicated that repeated mammography starting at age fifty saves about 1.8 lives over 15 years for every 1,000 women screened. This result has to be weighed against the adverse effects of errors in diagnosis, over-treatment, and radiation exposure.

The Cochrane analysis of screening indicates that it is "not clear whether screening does more good than harm". According to their analysis, 1 in 2,000 women will have her life prolonged by 10 years of screening, while 10 healthy women will undergo unnecessary breast cancer treatment. Additionally, 200 women will experience significant psychological stress due to false positive results.

The Cochrane Collaboration (2013) concluded after ten years that trials with adequate randomization did not find an effect of mammography screening on total cancer mortality, including breast cancer. The authors of this Cochrane review write: "If we assume that screening reduces breast cancer mortality by 15% and that overdiagnosis and over-treatment is at 30%, it means that for every 2,000 women invited for screening throughout 10 years, one will avoid dying of breast cancer and 10 healthy women, who would not have been diagnosed if there had not been screening, will be treated unnecessarily. Furthermore, more than 200 women will experience important psychological distress including anxiety and uncertainty for years because of false positive findings." The authors conclude that the time has come to re-assess whether universal mammography screening should be recommended for any age group. They state that universal screening may not be reasonable. The Nordic Cochrane Collection updated research in 2012 and stated that advances in diagnosis and treatment make mammography screening less effective today, rendering it "no longer effective". They conclude that "it therefore no longer seems reasonable to attend" for breast cancer screening at any age, and warn of misleading information on the internet.

Newman posits that screening mammography does not reduce death overall, but causes significant harm by inflicting cancer scare and unnecessary surgical interventions. The Nordic Cochrane Collection notes that advances in diagnosis and treatment of breast cancer may make breast cancer screening no longer effective in decreasing death from breast cancer, and therefore no longer recommend routine screening for healthy women as the risks might outweigh the benefits.

Of every 1,000 U.S. women who are screened, about 7% will be called back for a diagnostic session (although some studies estimate the number to be closer to 10–15%). About 10% of those who are called back will be referred for a biopsy. Of the 10% referred for biopsy, about 3.5% will have cancer and 6.5% will not. Of the 3.5% who have cancer, about 2 will have an early stage cancer that will be cured after treatment.

Mammography may also produce false negatives. Estimates of the numbers of cancers missed by mammography are usually around 20%. Reasons for not seeing the cancer include observer error, but more frequently it is because the cancer is hidden by other dense tissue in the breast, and even after retrospective review of the mammogram the cancer cannot be seen. Furthermore, one form of breast cancer, lobular cancer, has a growth pattern that produces shadows on the mammogram that are indistinguishable from normal breast tissue.

=== Mortality ===
The Cochrane Collaboration states that the best quality evidence does not demonstrate a reduction in mortality or a reduction in mortality from all types of cancer from screening mammography.

The Canadian Task Force found that for women ages 50 to 69, screening 720 women once every 2 to 3 years for 11 years would prevent one death from breast cancer. For women ages 40 to 49, 2,100 women would need to be screened at the same frequency and period to prevent a single death from breast cancer.

Women whose breast cancer was detected by screening mammography before the appearance of a lump or other symptoms commonly assume that the mammogram "saved their lives". In practice, the vast majority of these women received no practical benefit from the mammogram. There are four categories of cancers found by mammography:

1. Cancers that are so easily treated that a later detection would have produced the same rate of cure (women would have lived even without mammography).
2. Cancers so aggressive that even early detection is too late to benefit the patient (women who die despite detection by mammography).
3. Cancers that would have receded on their own or are so slow-growing that the woman would die of other causes before the cancer produced symptoms (mammography results in over-diagnosis and over-treatment of this class).
4. A small number of breast cancers that are detected by screening mammography and whose treatment outcome improves as a result of earlier detection.

Only 3–13% of breast cancers detected by screening mammography will fall into this last category. Clinical trial data suggests that 1 woman per 1,000 healthy women screened over 10 years falls into this category. Screening mammography produces no benefit to any of the remaining 87–97% of women. The probability of a woman falling into any of the above four categories varies with age.

A 2016 review for the United States Preventive Services Task Force found that mammography was associated with an 8–33% decrease in breast cancer mortality in different age groups, but that this decrease was not statistically significant at the age groups of 39–49 and 70–74. The same review found that mammography significantly decreased the risk of advanced cancer among women aged 50 and older by 38%, but among those aged 39 to 49 the risk reduction was a non-significant 2%. The USPSTF made their review based on data from randomized controlled trials (RCT) studying breast cancer in women between the ages of 40–49.

=== False positives ===
The goal of any screening procedure is to examine a large population of patients and find the small number most likely to have a serious condition. These patients are then referred for further, usually more invasive, testing. Thus a screening exam is not intended to be definitive; rather it is intended to have sufficient sensitivity to detect a useful proportion of cancers. The cost of higher sensitivity is a larger number of results that would be regarded as suspicious in patients without disease. This is true of mammography. The patients without disease who are called back for further testing from a screening session (about 7%) are sometimes referred to as "false positives". There is a trade-off between the number of patients with disease found and the much larger number of patients without disease that must be re-screened.

Research shows that false-positive mammograms may affect women's well-being and behavior. Some women who receive false-positive results may be more likely to return for routine screening or perform breast self-examinations more frequently. However, some women who receive false-positive results become anxious, worried, and distressed about the possibility of having breast cancer, feelings that can last for many years.

False positives also mean greater expense, both for the individual and for the screening program. Since follow-up screening is typically much more expensive than initial screening, more false positives (that must receive follow-up) means that fewer women may be screened for a given amount of money. Thus as sensitivity increases, a screening program will cost more or be confined to screening a smaller number of women.

=== Overdiagnosis ===
The central harm of mammographic breast cancer screening is overdiagnosis: the detection of abnormalities that meet the pathologic definition of cancer but will never progress to cause symptoms or death. Dr. H. Gilbert Welch, a researcher at Dartmouth College, states that "screen-detected breast and prostate cancer survivors are more likely to have been over-diagnosed than actually helped by the test." Estimates of overdiagnosis associated with mammography have ranged from 1% to 54%. In 2009, Peter C. Gotzsche and Karsten Juhl Jørgensen reviewed the literature and found that 1 in 3 cases of breast cancer detected in a population offered mammographic screening is over-diagnosed. In contrast, a 2012 panel convened by the national cancer director for England and Cancer Research UK concluded that 1 in 5 cases of breast cancer diagnosed among women who have undergone breast cancer screening are over-diagnosed. This means an over-diagnosis rate of 129 women per 10,000 invited to screening. A recent systematic review of 30 studies found that screening mammography for breast cancer among women aged 40 years and older was 12.6%.

=== False negatives ===
Mammograms also have a rate of missed tumors, or "false negatives". Accurate data regarding the number of false negatives are very difficult to obtain because mastectomies cannot be performed on every woman who has had a mammogram to determine the false negative rate. Estimates of the false negative rate depend on close follow-up of a large number of patients for many years. This is difficult in practice because many women do not return for regular mammography making it impossible to know if they ever developed a cancer. In his book The Politics of Cancer, Dr. Samuel S. Epstein claims that in women ages 40 to 49, one in four cancers are missed at each mammography. Researchers have found that breast tissue is denser among younger women, making it difficult to detect tumors. For this reason, false negatives are twice as likely to occur in pre-menopausal mammograms (Prate). This is why the screening program in the UK does not start calling women for screening mammograms until age 50.

The importance of these missed cancers is not clear, particularly if the woman is getting yearly mammograms. Research on a closely related situation has shown that small cancers that are not acted upon immediately, but are observed over periods of several years, will have good outcomes. A group of 3,184 women had mammograms that were formally classified as "probably benign". This classification is for patients who are not clearly normal but have some area of minor concern. This results not in the patient being biopsied, but rather in having early follow up mammography every six months for three years to determine whether there has been any change in status. Of these 3,184 women, 17 (0.5%) did have cancers. Most importantly, when the diagnosis was finally made, they were all still stage 0 or 1, the earliest stages. Five years after treatment, none of these 17 women had evidence of re-occurrence. Thus, small early cancers, even though not acted on immediately, were still reliably curable.

=== Cost-effectiveness ===
Breast cancer imposes a significant economic strain on communities, with the expense of treating stages three and four in the United States in 2017 amounting to approximately $127,000. While early diagnosis and screening methods are important in reducing the death rates, the cost-benefit of breast cancer screening using mammography has been unclear. A recent systematic review of three studies held in Spain, Denmark, and the United States from 2000 to 2019 found that digital mammography is not cost-beneficial for the healthcare system when compared to other screening methods. Therefore, increasing its frequency may cause higher costs on the healthcare system. While there may be a lack of evidence, it is suggested that digital mammography be performed every two years for ages over 50.

=== Arguments against the USPSTF recommendations ===
As the USPSTF recommendations are so influential, changing mammography screenings from 50 to 40 years of age has significant implications to public health. The major concerns regarding this update is whether breast cancer mortality has truly been increasing and if there is new evidence that the benefits of mammography are increasing.

According to National Vital Statistics System, mortality from breast cancer has been steadily decreasing in the United States from 2018 to 2021. There have also been no new randomized trials of screening mammography for women in their 40s since the previous USPSTF recommendation was made. In addition, the 8 most recent randomized trials for this age group revealed no significant effect. Instead, the USPSTF used statistical models to estimate what would happen if the starting age were lowered, assuming that screening mammography reduces breast cancer mortality by 25%. This found that screening 1,000 women from 40–74 years of age, instead of 50–74, would cause 1–2 fewer breast cancer deaths per 1,000 women screened over a lifetime.

Approximately 75 percent of women diagnosed with breast cancer have no family history of breast cancer or other factors that put them at high risk for developing the disease (so screening only high-risk women misses majority of cancers). An analysis by Hendrick and Helvie, published in the American Journal of Roentgenology, showed that if USPSTF breast cancer screening guidelines were followed, approximately 6,500 additional women each year in the U.S. would die from breast cancer.

The largest (Hellquist et al) and longest running (Tabar et al) breast cancer screening studies in history re-confirmed that regular mammography screening cut breast cancer deaths by roughly a third in all women ages 40 and over (including women ages 40–49). This renders the USPSTF calculations off by half. They used a 15% mortality reduction to calculate how many women needed to be invited to be screened to save a life. With the now re-confirmed 29% (or up) figure, the number to be screened using the USPSTF formula is half of their estimate and well within what they considered acceptable by their formula.

== Society and culture ==
=== Screening engagement ===
Many factors affect how many people attend breast cancer screenings. For example, people from minority ethnic communities are also less likely to attend cancer screening. In the UK, women of South Asian heritage are the least likely to attend breast cancer screening. Research is still needed to identify specific barriers for the different South Asian communities. For example, a study showed that British-Pakistani women faced cultural and language barriers and were not aware that breast screening takes place in a female-only environment.

People with mental illnesses are also less likely to attend cancer screening appointments. In Northern Ireland women with mental health problems were shown to be less likely to attend screening for breast cancer, than women without. The lower attendance numbers remained the same even when marital status and social deprivation were taken into account.

Mammography can also cause anxiety, which can be due to generalized cancer fear, fear of screening components, fear of screening outcomes, and anxiety related to false positives. Screening behavior varies depending on the source of anxiety. For example, generalized cancer fear can lead to greater motivation to get screened, while fear of screening components can result in avoidance of screening. Meanwhile, fear of screening outcomes and false positive anxiety can show mixed results in screening behavior. However, the increase in screening engagement from generalized cancer fear appears to primarily affect White women, not Black or Hispanic women, due to factors such as low income, lack of insurance or transportation, language barriers, limited access to healthcare, medical mistrust, fear of inadequate care or exploitation, and fear of pain and radiation. Overall, immediate interpretation of screening mammograms, patient education, improved communication and clinical environments, and relaxation techniques are interventions that can reduce anxiety.

== Regulation ==
Mammography facilities in the United States and its territories (including military bases) are subject to the Mammography Quality Standards Act (MQSA). The act requires annual inspections and accreditation every three years through an FDA-approved body. Facilities found deficient during the inspection or accreditation process can be barred from performing mammograms until corrective action has been verified or, in extreme cases, can be required to notify past patients that their exams were sub-standard and should not be relied upon.

At this time, MQSA applies only to traditional mammography and not to related scans, such as breast ultrasound, stereotactic breast biopsy, or breast MRI.

As of September 10, 2024, the MQSA requires that all patients be notified of their breast density ("dense" or "not dense") in their mammogram reports.

== Research ==
=== Artificial intelligence (AI) algorithms ===
Recently, artificial intelligence (AI) programs have been developed to utilize features from screening mammography images to predict breast cancer risk. A systematic review of 16 retrospective study designs comparing median maximum AUC found that artificial intelligence had a comparable or better accuracy (AUC = 0.72) of predicting breast cancer than clinical risk factors alone (AUC = 0.61), suggesting a transition from clinical risk factor-based to AI image-based risk models may lead to more accurate and personalized risk-based screening approaches.

Another study of 32 published papers involving 23,804 mammograms and various machine learning methods (CNN, ANN, and SVM) found promising results in the ability to assist clinicians in large-scale population-based breast cancer screening programs.

== See also ==
- Computed tomography laser mammography
- Molecular breast imaging
- Xeromammography
