= Breast imaging =

Medical imaging of human breasts

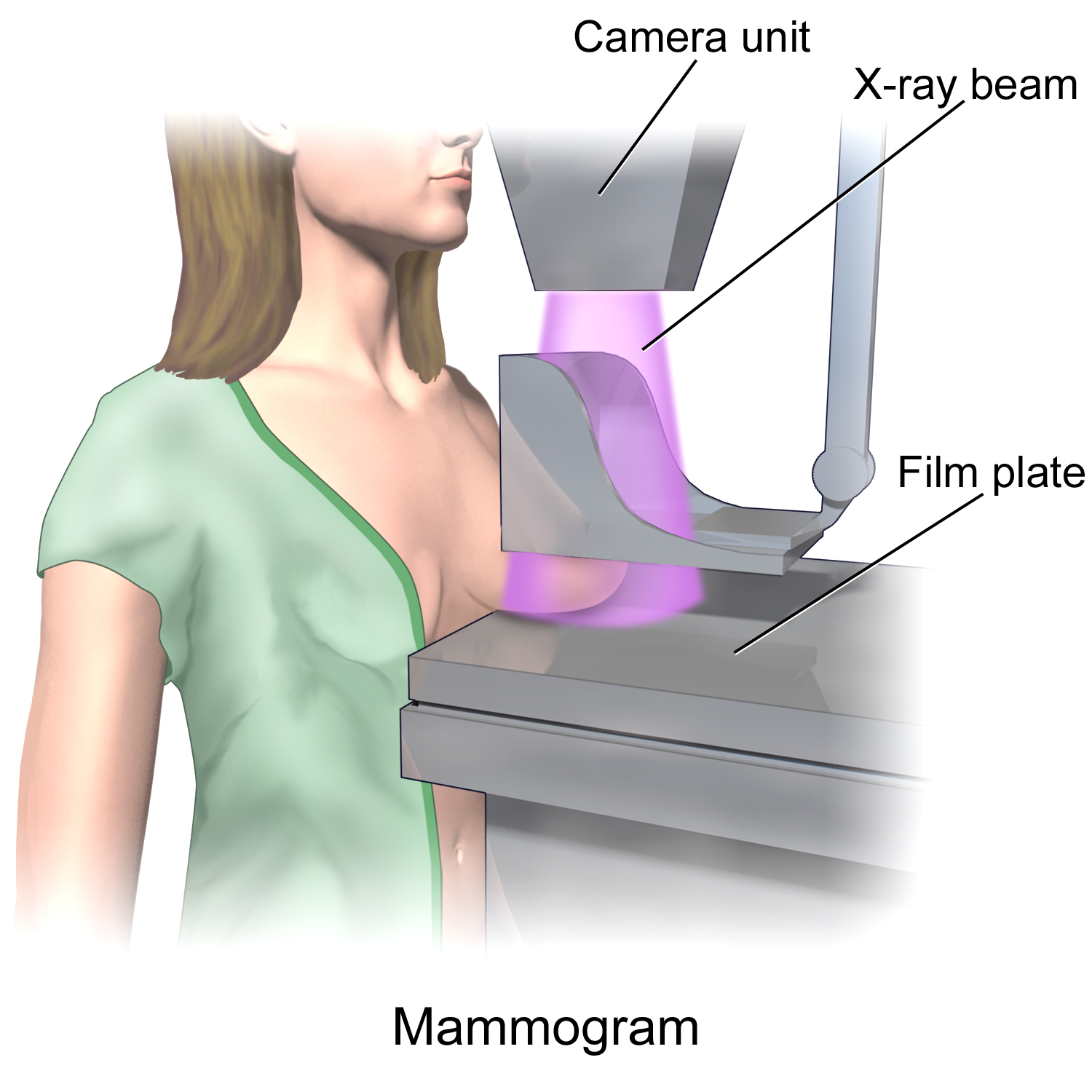
Schematic image showing a woman undergoing a mammogram imaging examination.

In medicine, breast imaging is a sub-speciality of diagnostic radiology that involves imaging of the breasts for screening or diagnostic purposes. There are various methods of breast imaging using a variety of technologies as described in detail below. Traditional screening and diagnostic mammography ("2D mammography") uses x-ray technology and has been the mainstay of breast imaging for many decades. Breast tomosynthesis ("3D mammography") is a relatively new digital x-ray mammography technique that produces multiple image slices of the breast similar to, but distinct from, computed tomography (CT). Xeromammography and galactography are somewhat outdated technologies that also use x-ray technology and are now used infrequently in the detection of breast cancer. Breast ultrasound is another technology employed in diagnosis and screening that can help differentiate between fluid filled and solid lesions, an important factor to determine if a lesion may be cancerous. Breast MRI is a technology typically reserved for high-risk patients and patients recently diagnosed with breast cancer. Lastly, scintimammography is used in a subgroup of patients who have abnormal mammograms or whose screening is not reliable on the basis of using traditional mammography or ultrasound.

== X-ray ==
=== Mammography ===
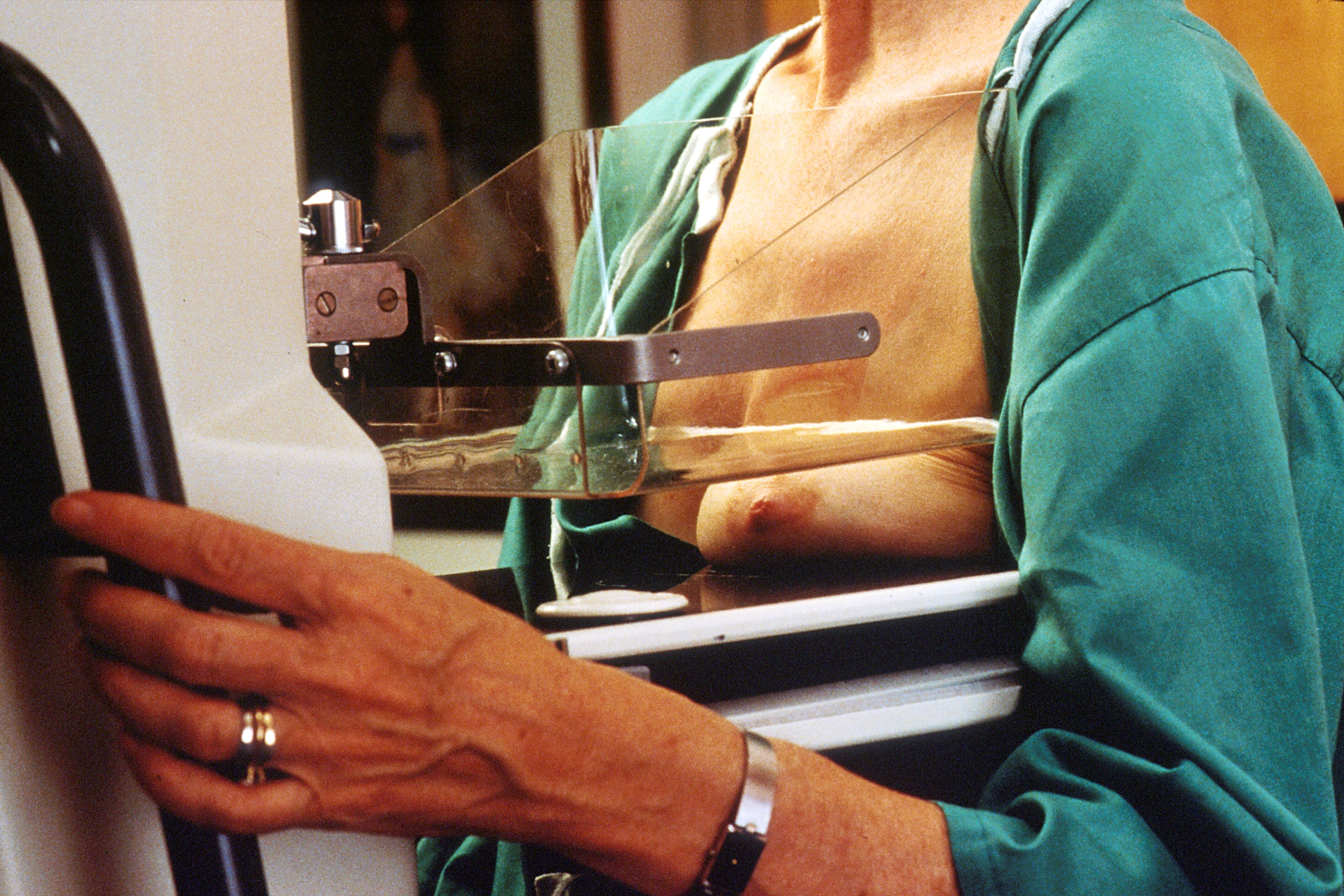
The best mammographic images are produced with compression which reduces radiation needed and spreads tissue to produce clearer images.

Mammography is the process of using low-energy X-rays (usually around 30 kVp) to examine the human breast, which is used as a diagnostic and screening tool. The goal of mammography is the early detection of breast cancer, typically through detection of characteristic masses and/or microcalcifications.

In addition to diagnostic purposes, mammography has interventional utility in stereotactic biopsies to precisely locate and find the area of concern and guide the biopsy needle to this precise location. This ensures that the area biopsies correlates to the abnormality seen on mammogram. It is called stereotactic since it uses images taken from two different angles of the same location. A biopsy is indicated when small accumulations of calcium are seen on mammogram, but cannot be felt on physical exam and do not appear on ultrasound.

=== Screening guidelines ===
For the average woman, the U.S. Preventive Services Task Force recommended (as of 2009) mammography every two years in women between the ages of 50 and 74. The American College of Radiology and American Cancer Society recommend yearly screening mammography starting at age 40. The Canadian Task Force on Preventive Health Care (2012) and the European Cancer Observatory (2011) recommends mammography every 2–3 years between 50 and 69. While the ACR notes that more infrequent screening would miss about a third of cancers and result in up to 10,000 cancer deaths, the task forces aforementioned also note that more frequent mammogram include a small but significant increase in breast cancer induced by radiation.

Mammography overall has a false-positive rate of approximately 10%. It has a false-negative (missed cancer) rate of between 7 and 12 percent. This is partly due to dense tissues obscuring the cancer and the fact that the appearance of cancer on mammograms has a large overlap with the appearance of normal tissues. Additionally, mammogram should not be done with any increased frequency in people undergoing breast surgery, including breast enlargement, mastopexy, and breast reduction.

In a study later done by the Cochrane Collaboration (2013), it concluded that the trials with adequate randomisation did not find an effect of mammography screening on total cancer mortality, including breast cancer, after 10 years. The authors of systematic review write: "If we assume that screening reduces breast cancer mortality by 15% and that overdiagnosis and overtreatment is at 30%, it means that for every 2000 women invited for screening throughout 10 years, one will avoid dying of breast cancer whereas 10 healthy women will be treated unnecessarily." The authors go on to conclude that the time has come to re-assess whether universal mammography screening should be recommended for any age group. Presently, Cochrane Collaboration recommends that women should at least be informed of the benefits and harms of mammography screening and have written an evidence-based leaflet in several languages that can be found on www.cochrane.dk.

==== Digital Breast Tomosynthesis (DBT) ====
Digital breast tomosynthesis (DBT) can provide a higher diagnostic accuracy compared to conventional mammography. The key to understanding DBT is analogous to understanding the difference between an x-ray and CT. Specifically, one is three dimensional whereas the other is flat. A mammogram usually takes two x-rays of each breast from different angles whereas digital tomosynthesis creates a 3-dimensional picture of the breast using x-rays.

In DBT, like conventional mammography, compression is used to improve image quality and decreases radiation dose. The laminographic imaging technique dates back to the 1930s and belongs to the category of geometric or linear tomography. Because the data acquired are very high resolution (85–160 micron typical), much higher than CT, DBT is unable to offer the narrow slice widths that CT offers (typically 1–1.5 mm). However, the higher resolution detectors permit very high in-plane resolution, even if the Z-axis resolution is less. The primary interest in DBT is in breast imaging, as an extension to mammography, where it offers better detection rates.

A recent study also looked at the radiation dose delivered by conventional mammography compared to DBT. While this study found that while there was a modest decrease in radiation dose delivery by digital mammography, the study concluded that the small dose increase should not prevent providers from using tomosynthesis given the evidence for potential clinical benefit.

Tomosynthesis is also now Food and Drug Administration (FDA) approved for use in breast cancer screening. Digital breast tomosynthesis is associated with a higher detection of poor prognosis cancers compared to digital mammography. since it is able to overcome the primary limitation of standard 2D mammography which had a masking effect due to the overlapping fibroglandular tissue, whereas DBT is able to distinguish between benign and malignant features, particularly in dense breasts. DBT has also been found to be a reliable tool for intraoperative surgical margin assessment in non-palpable lesions thus reducing the volume of breast excision without increasing the risk of cancer recurrence.

==== Xeromammography ====
No longer in widespread use, xeromammography is a photoelectric method of recording an x-ray image on a coated metal plate, using low-energy photon beams, long exposure time, and dry chemical developers. It is a form of xeroradiography.

Radiation exposure is an important factor in risk assessment since it makes up 98% of the effective dose. Currently, the mean value of the absorbed dose in the glandular tissue is used as a description of radiation risk since the glandular tissue is the most vulnerable part of the breast.

=== Galactography ===
Galactography is a medical diagnostic procedure for viewing the milk ducts. It can be a useful procedure in the early diagnosis of patients with pathologic nipple discharge although it has more recently been replaced by breast MRI as the standard of care for evaluation of suspicious nipple discharge. The standard treatment of galactographically suspicious breast lesions is to perform a surgical intervention on the concerned duct or ducts: if the discharge clearly stems from a single duct, then the excision of the duct (microdochectomy) is indicated; if the discharge comes from several ducts or if no specific duct could be determined, then a subareolar resection of the ducts (Hadfield's procedure) is performed instead. To avoid infection, galactography should not be performed when the nipple discharge contains pus.

There is also some utility for tomosynthesis to be used with galactography. In a study published by Schulz-Wendtland R et al., investigators made more mistakes when using only ductal sonography compared to when they used contrast-enhanced galactography with tomosynthesis which allowed for generated synthetic digital 2D full-field mammograms to diagnose suspicious lesions.

== MRI ==
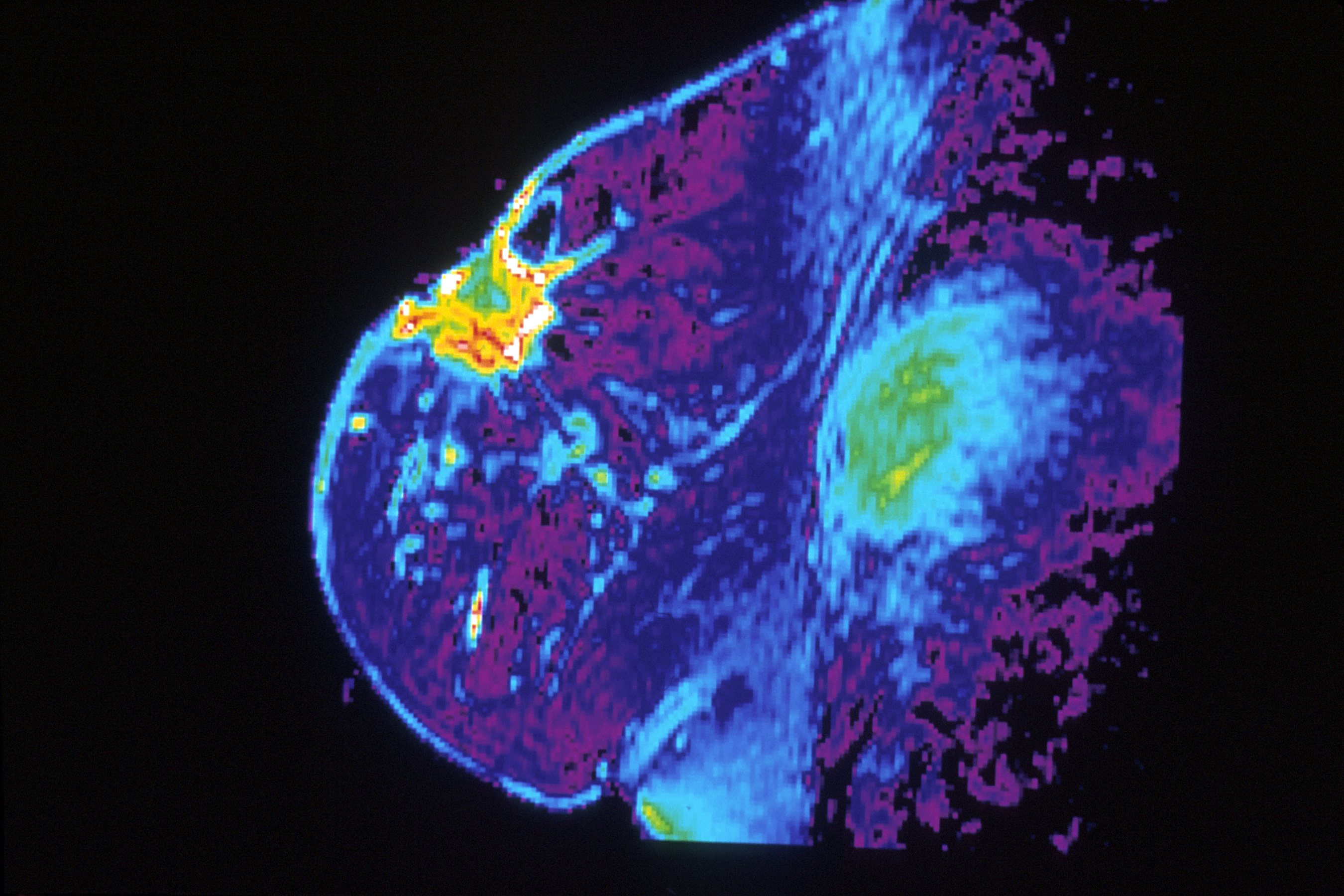
A color-enhanced MRI of a breast

Breast MRI, an alternative to mammography, has shown substantial progress in the detection of breast cancer. The available literature suggests that the sensitivity of contrast-enhanced breast MRI in detection of cancer is considerably higher than that of either radiographic mammography or ultrasound and is generally reported to be in excess of 94%. The specificity (the confidence that a lesion is cancerous and not a false positive) is only fair ('modest'), (or 37%–97%), thus a positive finding by MRI should not be interpreted as a definitive diagnosis. The reports of 4,271 breast MRIs from eight large-scale clinical trials were reviewed in 2006.

Currently, American and European guidelines both recommend MRI screening as the optimum imaging modality but differences exist in regards to screening for certain patient subgroups. MRI has shown specific utility in women with extremely dense breast tissue. By using supplemental MRI in these women who had otherwise normal mammography results, there was a diagnosis of significantly fewer interval cancers than when using mammography alone during a two-year period.

One of the other advantages of MRI screening is in cancer treatment. Specifically, MRI shows increased detection of small cancers which have less associated lymph node involvement and consequently decreased frequency of interval cancers which affect survival and mortality. Additionally, MRI Is also shown to be more accurate than mammography, ultrasound, or clinical exam in evaluating treatment response to neoadjuvant therapy.

== Ultrasound ==
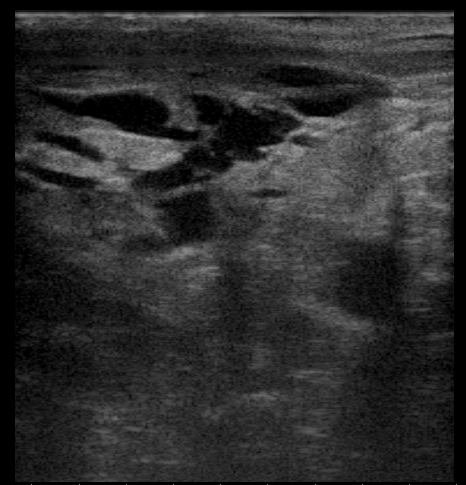
Breast ultrasounds may be used with or without a mammogram.

Breast ultrasound is the use of medical ultrasonography to perform imaging of the breast. It can be used as either a diagnostic or a screening procedure. It may be used either with or without a mammogram.

Diagnostic anatomic ultrasound looks at the anatomy whereas diagnostic functional ultrasound records information such as blood flow or tissue characteristics. A specific functional form of ultrasound is elastography which measures and displays the relative elasticity of tissues, which can be used to differentiate tumors from healthy tissue. Recent studies have shown that shear wave elastography in primary invasive breast carcinoma could be useful for indicating axillary lymphadenopathy.

Ultrasound is also used surgically. Specifically, an ultrasound-guided needle biopsy allows providers to see the needle so it can be directed toward the lesion of concern while avoiding other critical structures such as blood vessels. Ultrasound-guided biopsies have also been shown to decrease re-excision and mastectomy rates in breast cancer. A recent study found 100% ultrasound localization with negative margins obtained in both non-palpable and palpable lesions at initial procedure. In line with this, intraoperative ultrasound guided breast conserving surgery is being increasingly used by breast surgeons worldwide

Contrast-enhanced ultrasound (CEUS) imaging has also been researched and shows similar sensitivity to MRI in detecting breast cancer across lesions of similar size. Additionally, the combined use of MRI and CEUS in lesions > 20 mm has been shown to optimize the diagnostic specificity and accuracy in breast cancer prediction.

== Scintimammography ==
Scintimammography is a type of breast imaging test that is used to detect cancer cells in the breasts of some women who have had abnormal mammograms, or for those who have dense breast tissue, post-operative scar tissue or breast implants, but is not used for screening or in place of a mammogram. Rather, it is used when the detection of breast abnormalities is not possible or not reliable on the basis of mammography and ultrasound. In the scintimammography procedure, a woman receives an injection of a small amount of a radioactive substance called technetium 99 sestamibi. This substance is preferably taken up by cancerous tissues, making them show brightly on the images. Research has also shown that Tc-99 Sestamibi wash out rate is a reliable test for predicting tumor response to neoadjuvant chemotherapy in locally advanced breast cancer.

== Diffuse optical mammography ==
Diffuse optical mammography is a non-invasive emerging technique that investigates the breast composition through spectral analysis. It is an example of diffuse optical imaging, still within the research environment. It showed promising results for breast cancer risk assessment, lesion characterization, therapy monitoring and prediction of therapy outcome.
