= Nipple discharge =

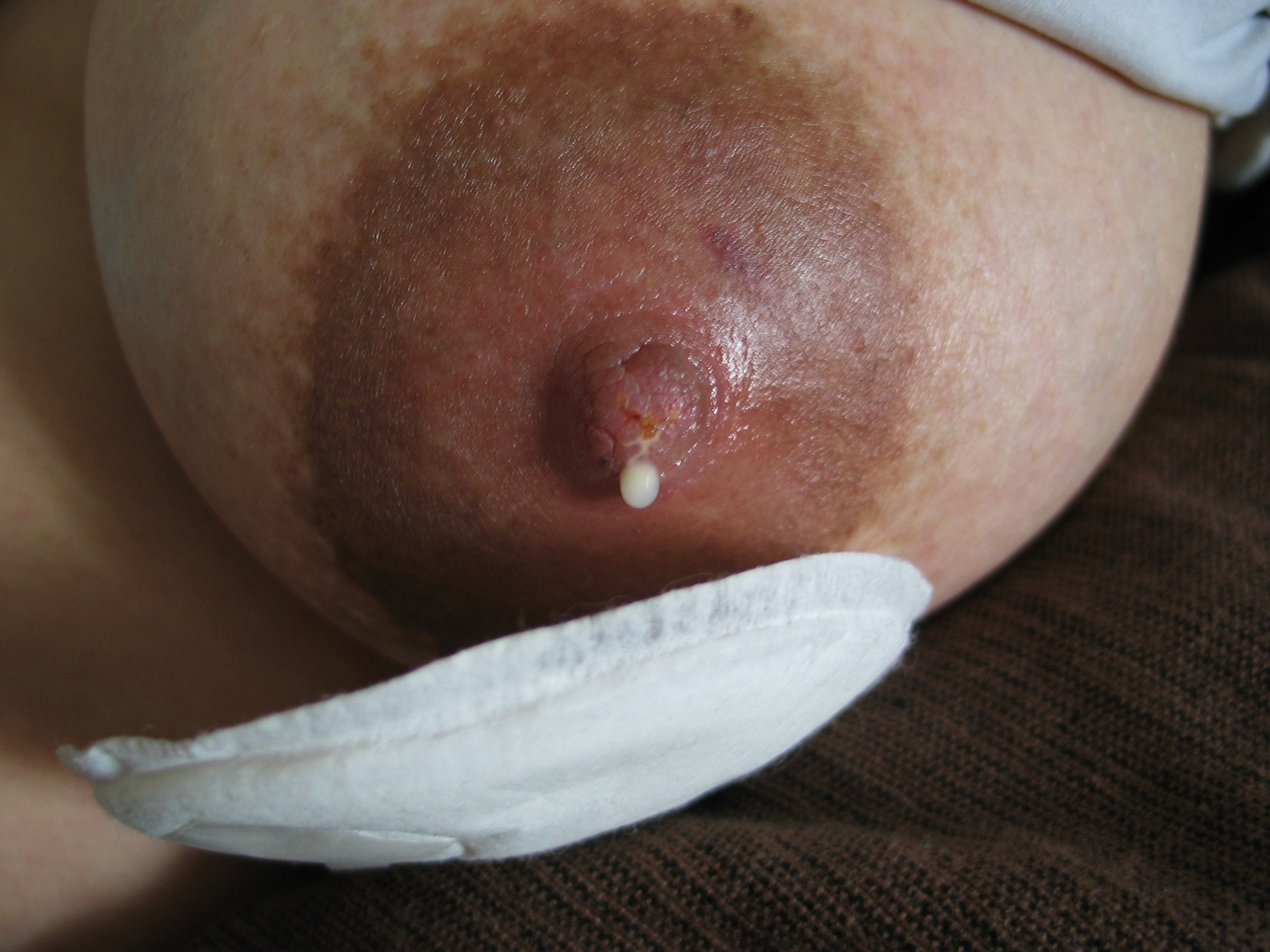
- Milk coming from the nipple
- Specialty: Gynecology
- Types: Physiologic, pathologic
- Diagnostic method: Normal: Late pregnancy, after childbirth, newborns Abnormal: Intraductal papilloma, duct ectasia, blocked milk duct, infected breast, breast cancer, high prolactin
- Treatment: Depends on the cause
- Frequency: Common

Nipple discharge is fluid from the nipple, with or without squeezing the breast. The discharge can be milky, clear, green, purulent, bloody, or faintly yellow. The consistency can be thick, thin, sticky, or watery.

Nipple discharge may be normal, such as milk in late pregnancy or after childbirth, and in newborns during the first weeks of life. It may also be normal following squeezing, in women during the reproductive years. It is likely abnormal if it occurs in men, contains blood, is from only one breast, or is associated with a breast lump, swelling, redness or overlying skin changes. Reasons for abnormal discharge include an intraductal papilloma, duct ectasia, blocked milk duct, infected breast (mastitis or breast abscess), breast cancer, certain medications, and conditions that raise prolactin.

Milky discharge in a non-pregnant, non-breast feeding women is evaluated differently to other abnormal nipple discharge. Often, the cause can be determined based on symptoms and examination. Blood tests may be done to rule out low thyroid or high prolactin. Other tests may include mammography, breast ultrasound, breast biopsy, or skin biopsy.

Treatment depends on the underlying cause. Duct ectasia may be treated with surgical removal of the ducts involved. Infectious causes may require antibiotics or incision and drainage. Nipple discharge is the third most common breast complaint by women, after breast pain and a breast lump. About 3% of breast cancer cases are associated with discharge.

== Signs and symptoms ==
Nipple discharge is fluid from the nipple, with or without squeezing the breast. The discharge can be milky, clear, green, purulent, bloody, or faintly yellow. The consistency can be thick, thin, sticky, or watery.

== Causes ==
Nipple discharge can arise from any one or more of the 15 to 20 milk ducts that each breast contains, and its causes can be divided into normal (physiological) and abnormal (pathological).

=== Normal ===
Milky liquid from nipples is normal during the last few weeks of pregnancy, after childbirth and during breastfeeding. Some newborn babies may leak a milky liquid which is usually normal and lasts a couple of weeks.

Stimulation of breasts by massage, using a breast pump or after mammography, may induce yellow, milky, or green nipple discharge in many healthy women of reproductive age.

=== Abnormal ===
Spontaneous nipple discharge unrelated to pregnancy or lactation is considered abnormal, but mostly have a non-serious cause. Nipple discharge in men is not normal. Discharge from nipples is also more likely to be abnormal (pathological) if it is crystal clear or blood-stained, is from only one breast, or is associated with a breast lump, swelling, redness or overlying skin changes.

A blocked or enlarged milk duct can result in nipple discharge.

Intraductal papillomas are non-cancerous lesions and most common in women age 30 to 50. Divided into central and peripheral papillomas, nipple discharge is more frequently observed when they are central. Up to half of women with intraductal papillomas may present with bloody nipple discharge, but it can also be straw-coloured. They are usually too small to feel and have a rare association with breast cancer.

15-20% of people with nipple discharge are found to have duct ectasia. This is usually in perimenopausal and menopausal women, who may have associated pain and retraction of the nipple. A lump may also be present.

Ductal carcinoma in situ (DCIS) usually presents with abnormal findings on mammography, but can less frequently present with a lump or nipple discharge in women, whereas in men with DCIS, nipple discharge is the common presentation.

Infection in a breast, either mastitis or breast abscess may cause a discharge. Eczema of the nipple may result in a discharge with crusting of the nipple skin.

Nipple discharge may be due to breast cancer, particularly if there is an accompanying breast lump. A blood-stained discharge may appear in Paget's disease.

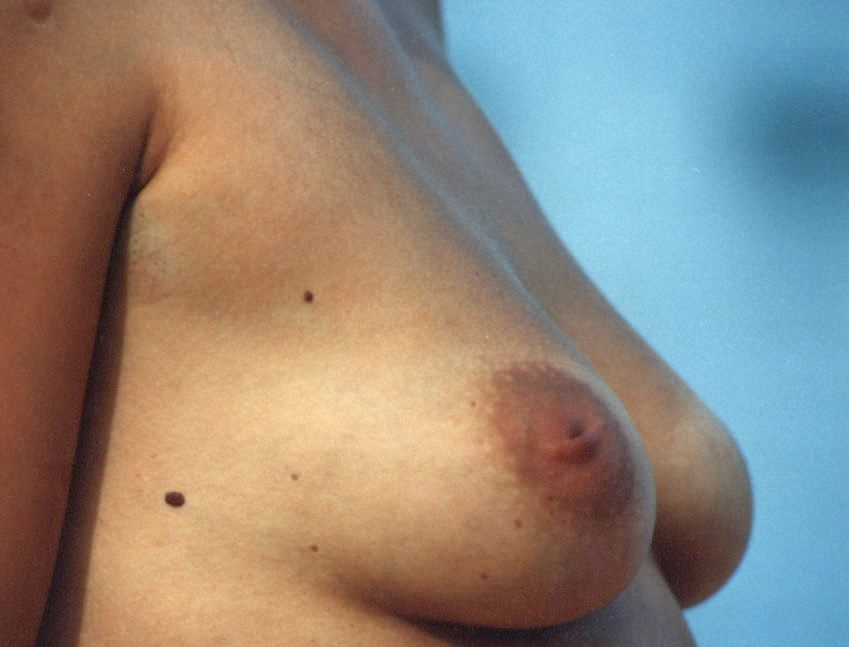
Dust ectasia, with nipple retraction

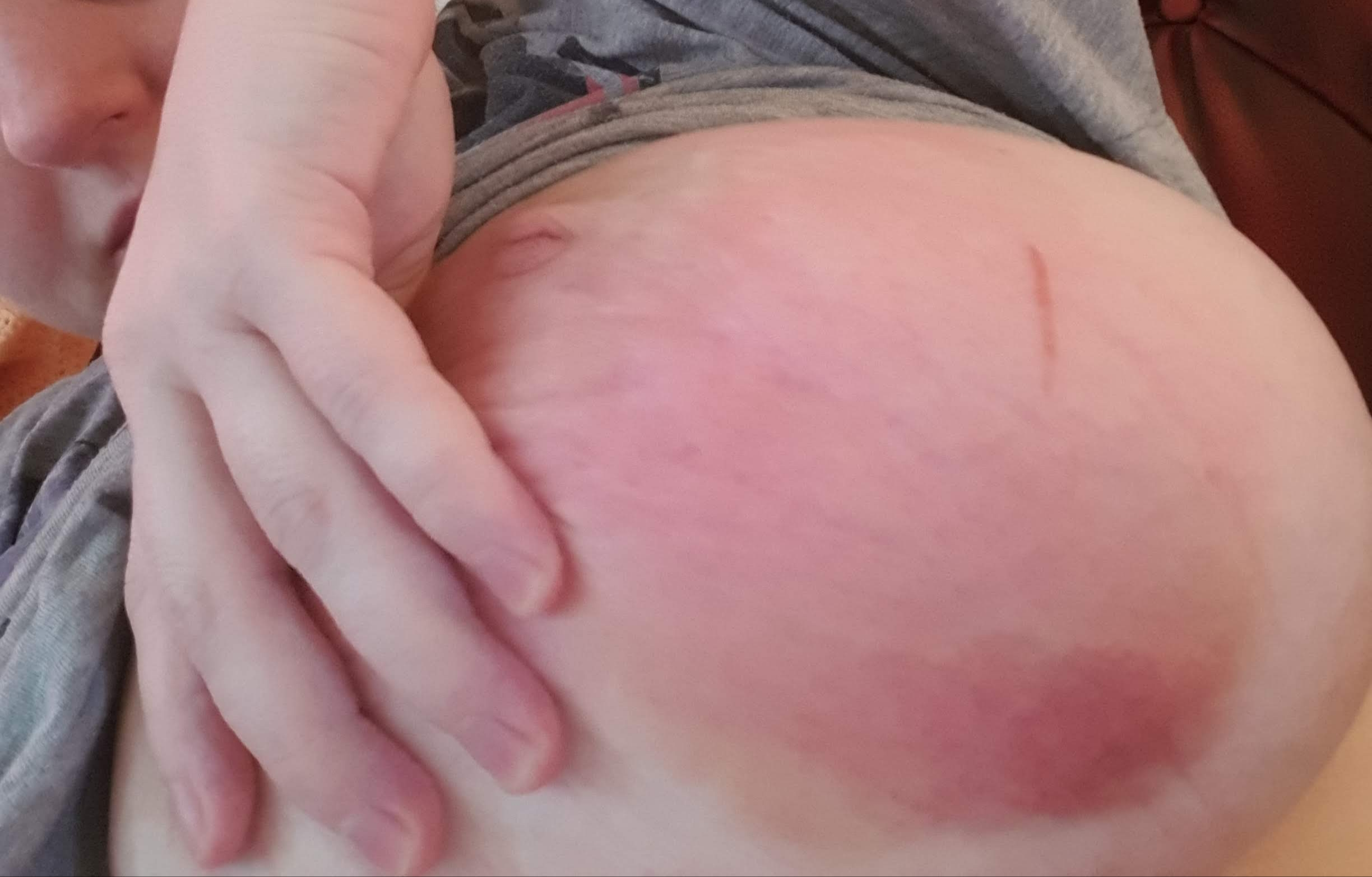
Mastitis in breast

Diagram showing ductal carcinoma in situ (DCIS)

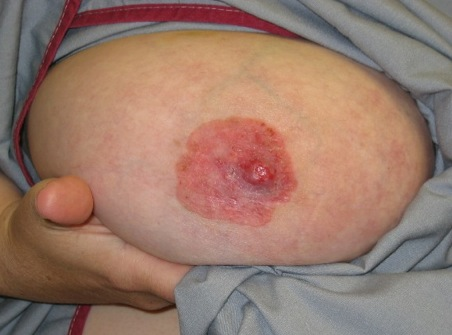
Paget's disease of the nipple

=== Milky ===
Some condition that cause a raised prolactin can result in a milky liquid appearing from nipples. These include endocrine causes such as pituitary and thyroid disease, and some medications. Such medications include:

- Medication for hypertension: Methyldopa, reserpine, verapamil
- Gastrointestinal agents: Cimetidine, metoclopramide
- Hormones: Estrogen, birth control pill
- Opiates: Codeine, heroin, methadone, morphine
- Psychotropic drugs: Antipsychotics, monoamine oxidase inhibitors, neuroleptics, selective serotonin reuptake inhibitors, tricyclic antidepressants

Some herbs including anise and fennel have also been implicated as causing leaking of fluid from nipples.

== Diagnosis ==
The evaluation of milky nipple discharge in a non-pregnant, not breast feeding women is different to the assessment of other abnormal nipple discharge. Often, the cause can be ascertained without performing tests.

When blood tests are requested, they usually include thyroid tests and prolactin to rule out hypothyroidism and hyperprolactinemia. Other tests that may be considered include mammography, breast ultrasound, CT scan of the head to rule out a pituitary tumour, breast biopsy, x-ray imaging of breast ducts or skin biopsy.

The absence of cancerous cells in samples of nipple discharge does not exclude cancer, hence cytology of the nipple discharge is not usually performed. However, guidance on investigations varies and tests are more likely performed if the discharge is bloody, from one breast, and the woman is age over 50. If the test is performed and malignant cells are found, an underlying cancer is highly likely.

== Treatment ==
Initially, an evaluation for cancer is indicated. Treatment will depend on the cause found, and may involve changing medication, having a lump removed, applying a cream to treat a skin condition or being given medication to treat the condition causing the discharge. Duct ectasia may be treated with surgical removal of the ducts involved. Infectious causes may require antibiotics and/or incision and drainage. Sometimes, no treatment is required.

If no abnormality is found, a surgical duct excision may resolve the symptoms. Treatment also depends on whether single-duct or multiple-duct discharge is present, and whether the symptoms of nipple discharge are distressing to the person. In some cases, there may be no need for any further intervention; in others, microdochectomy or a total duct excision may be appropriate. If the person wishes to conserve the ability to breastfeed and only single-duct discharge is present, then ductoscopy or galactography should be considered in view of performing a localised duct excision.

== Epidemiology ==
Nipple discharge is the third most common breast complaint by women, after breast pain and a breast lump. 10% of women can notice a nipple discharge when squeezing their breast and more than 50% of women can experience this using a breast pump.

Most abnormal nipple discharge is not associated with breast cancer, but 1-5% of breast cancers present with nipple discharge.
