= Nonpuerperal mastitis =

Breast inflammation not related to pregnancy or breastfeeding

The term nonpuerperal mastitis describes inflammatory lesions of the breast (mastitis) that occur unrelated to pregnancy and breastfeeding.

It is sometimes equated with duct ectasia, but other forms can be described.

== Types ==
=== Duct ectasia—periductal mastitis complex ===
Duct ectasia in the literal sense (literally: duct widening) is a very common and thus rather unspecific finding, increasing with age. However, in the way in which the term is mostly used, duct ectasia is an inflammatory condition of the larger-order lactiferous ducts. It is considered likely that the condition is associated with aseptic (chemical) inflammation related to the rupture of ducts or cysts. It is controversial whether duct dilation occurs first and leads to secretory stasis and subsequent periductal inflammation or whether inflammation occurs first and leads to an inflammatory weakening of the duct walls and then stasis. When the inflammation is complicated by necrosis and secondary bacterial infection, breast abscesses may form. Subareolar abscess, also called Zuska's disease (only nonpuerperal case), is a frequently aseptic inflammation and has been associated with squamous metaplasia of the lactiferous ducts.

The duct ectasia—periductal mastitis complex affects two groups of women: young women (in their late teens and early 20s) and perimenopausal women. Women in the younger group mostly have inverted nipples due to squamous metaplasia that lines the ducts more extensively compared to other women and produces keratin plugs which in turn lead to duct obstruction and then duct dilation, secretory stasis, inflammation, infection and abscess. This is not typically the case for women in the older group; in this group, there is likely a multifactorial etiology involving the balance in estrogen, progesterone and prolactin.

Treatment of mastitis and/or abscess in nonlactating women is largely the same as that of lactational mastitis, generally involving antibiotics treatment, possibly surgical intervention by means of fine-needle aspiration and/or incision and drainage and/or interventions on the lactiferous ducts (for details, see also the articles on treatment of mastitis, of breast abscess and of subareolar abscess). Additionally, an investigation for possible malignancy is needed, normally by means of mammography, and a pathological investigation such as a biopsy may be necessary to exclude malignant mastitis. Although no causal relation with breast cancer has been established, there appears to be an increased statistical risk of breast cancer, warranting a long-term surveillance of patients diagnosed with non-puerperal mastitis.

Nonpuerperal breast abscesses have a higher rate of recurrence compared to puerperal breast abscesses. There is a high statistical correlation of nonpuerperal breast abscess with diabetes mellitus (DM). On this basis, it has recently been suggested that diabetes screening should be performed on patients with such abscesses.

=== Granulomatous mastitis ===
Characteristic for granulomatous mastitis are multinucleated giant cells and epithelioid histiocytes around lobules. Often minor ductal and periductal inflammation is present. The lesion is in some cases very difficult to distinguish from breast cancer.

=== Comedo mastitis ===
Comedo mastitis is a very rare form similar to granulomatous mastitis but with tissue necrosis. Because it is so rare it may be sometimes confused with comedo carcinoma of the breast although the conditions appear to be completely unrelated.
