= Microdochectomy =

Surgical removal of a lactiferous duct

- Specialty: Surgical oncology

Microdochectomy is the surgical removal (excision) of a lactiferous duct. A mere incision of a mammary duct (without excision) is called microdochotomy.

== Indication ==
Microdochectomy is a standard treatment of in case there is nipple discharge which stems from a single duct. There are preliminary indications that if ductoscopy and close follow-up are performed, in some cases microdochectomy may not be necessary despite bloody nipple discharge.

Duct excision may also be indicated for the treatment of recurrent breast abscess and mastitis; in this case however the total removal of all ducts from behind the nipple has been recommended to avoid further recurrence.

Galactography may be used to investigate the condition of the mammary duct system before the intervention. Pre-operatively, also breast ultrasound and mammogram are performed to rule out other abnormalities of the breast.

If the condition involves only a single duct, then microdochectomy may be indicated, in particular in women wishing to preserve the ability to breastfeed; if the condition involves from several ducts or if no specific duct could be determined, then a subareolar resection of the ducts (central duct excision, also called Hadfield's procedure) may be indicated instead.

== Procedure ==
A radial cut or preferably a circumareolar cut (following the circular line of the areola) is made and a milk duct is removed. The removed duct is normally sent for histologic examination.

The excision can be directed by ductoscopy.

== Complications ==
Possible complications of the procedure include temporary or permanent alteration to the shape, sensation or pigmentation of the nipple, such as a minor change to the contour of the nipple-areola region. Although microdochectomy usually preserves the ability to breastfeed, nonetheless the loss of breastfeeding ability is a known complication. Furthermore, infection or hematoma may occur, and there may be a poor cosmetic result.
