= Central duct excision =

- Other names: major duct excision or Hadfield's procedure

Central duct excision is the surgical removal (excision) of all lactiferous duct under the nipple. The excision of a single duct is called microdochectomy, a mere incision of a mammary duct (without excision) is microdochotomy.

== Indication ==
Central duct excision is a standard treatment of in case there is nipple discharge which stems from multiple ducts or cannot be traced back to a single duct. It is also indicated if there is bloody nipple discharge in patients beyond childbearing age.

Duct excision may be indicated for the treatment of recurrent breast abscess and mastitis, and the total removal of all ducts from behind the nipple has been recommended to avoid further recurrence. In particular if the patient wishes to preserve breastfeeding ability, the condition of the mammary duct system is investigated by means of galactography (ductography) or ductoscopy in order to determine whether the excision of a single duct (microdochectomy) would be sufficient.

Pre-operatively, also breast ultrasound and mammogram are performed to rule out other abnormalities of the breast.

== Procedure ==
A circumareolar cut (following the circular line of the areola) is made, the ducts are divided from the underside of the nipple, and the surrounding breast tissue is removed to a depth of 2–3 cm behind the nipple-areola complex.

== Complications ==
Possible complications of the procedure include nipple tip necrosis, in which case further surgery may become necessary to recreate the nipple. A further complication is altered sensation, shape, size and color of the nipple, including nipple inversion. Furthermore, infection or hematoma may occur. These risks are higher than they are for the microdochectomy procedure.

After all or most ducts are excised, breastfeeding is no longer possible.
