= Cyst of Montgomery =

Benign breast mass found in adolescent girls

A cyst of Montgomery is a benign breast mass, usually found in adolescent girls. Typically, it resolves spontaneously by itself.

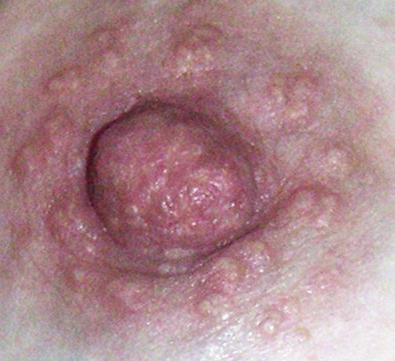
Montgomery glands around the nipple.

== Symptoms ==
A cyst of Montgomery may be asymptomatic. Yet, a cyst of Montgomery usually is diagnosed when a female patient, 10–20 years of age, complains to a healthcare professional of breast pain (mastalgia), inflammation or a palpable nodule in the breast. The diagnosis is made clinically, when a palpable nodule is felt in the retroareolar area.

== Pathophysiology ==
The periareolar glands of Montgomery in the breast are also called Montgomery tubercles or Morgagni tubercles. These periareolar glands are small, papular tissue projections at the edge of the areola (nipple).Obstruction of the Montgomery tubercles may result in an acute inflammation, a clear or light brownish fluid may drain out of the areola (nipple discharge), and an subareolar mass may develop, the cyst of Montgomery.

== Diagnosis ==
The diagnosis can be confirmed with ultrasonography, frequently showing a simple cyst in the retroareolar area. In some patients, multiple cysts or bilateral cysts may exist. Cysts of Montgomery may have liquid content with an echogenic or calcific sediment.

== Treatment and prognosis ==
The clinical management of a cyst of Montgomery depends upon the symptoms of the patient.

If there are no signs of infection, a cyst of Montgomery can be observed, because more than 80% resolve spontaneously, over only a few months. However, in some cases, spontaneous resolution may take up two years. In such cases, a repeat ultrasonography may become necessary. If, however, the patient has signs of an infection, for example reddening (erythema), warmth, pain and tenderness, a treatment for mastitis can be initiated, which may include antibiotics and non-steroidal anti-inflammatory drugs (NSAIDs). With treatment, inflammatory changes usually disappear quickly. In rare cases, drainage may become necessary. A surgical treatment of a cyst of Montgomery, i.e. a resection, may become necessary only if a cyst of Montgomery persists, or the diagnosis is questioned clinically.

The prognosis seems to be excellent. In one series, all adolescent patients with a cyst of Montgomery had a favourable outcome.

== Synonym ==
Cyst of Montgomery is also called retroareolar cyst.
