= Subareolar abscess =

Subcutaneous abscess of the breast tissue beneath the areola of the nipple

Drawing of breast abscess

Subareolar abscess, also called Zuska's disease for non pregnancy related cases, is a subcutaneous abscess of the breast tissue beneath the nipple. It is a frequently aseptic inflammation and has been associated with squamous metaplasia of lactiferous ducts.

The term is usually understood to include breast abscesses located in the retroareolar region or the periareolar region but not those located in the periphery of the breast.

Subareolar abscess can develop both during lactation or extrapuerperal, the abscess is often flaring up and down with repeated fistulation.

== Pathophysiology ==
90% of cases are smokers, however only a very small fraction of smokers appear to develop this lesion. It has been speculated that either the direct toxic effect or hormonal changes related to smoking could cause squamous metaplasia of lactiferous ducts. It is not well established whether the lesion regresses after smoking cessation.

Extrapuerperal cases are often associated with hyperprolactinemia or with thyroid problems. Also diabetes mellitus may be a contributing factor in nonpuerperal breast abscess.

== Treatment ==
Treatment is problematic unless an underlying endocrine disorder can be successfully diagnosed and treated.

A study by Goepel and Panhke provided indications that the inflammation should be controlled by bromocriptine even in absence of hyperprolactinemia.

Antibiotic treatment is administered for acute inflammation. However, this approach is rarely effective on its own, and the treatment of a subareolar abscess is primarily surgical. In cases of an acute abscess, incision and drainage are performed, followed by antibiotic therapy. In contrast to peripheral breast abscesses, which often resolve after antibiotic treatment and incision and drainage, subareolar breast abscesses tend to recur and are frequently accompanied by the formation of fistulas connecting the inflamed area to the skin surface. In many instances, particularly in patients with recurrent subareolar abscesses, excision of the affected lactiferous ducts is indicated, along with the removal of any chronic abscess or fistula. This procedure can be performed using either a radial or circumareolar incision.

There is no universal agreement on what should be the standard way of treating the condition. In a recent review article, antibiotics treatment, ultrasound evaluation and, if fluid is present, ultrasound-guided fine needle aspiration of the abscess with an 18 gauge needle, under saline lavage until clear, has been suggested as initial line of treatment for breast abscess in puerperal and non-puerperal cases including central (subareolar) abscess (see breast abscess for details). Elsewhere, it has been stated that treatment of subareolar abscess is unlikely to work if it does not address the ducts as such.

Duct resection has been traditionally used to treat the condition; the original Hadfield procedure has been improved many times but long-term success rate remains poor even for radical surgery. Petersen even suggests that damage caused by previous surgery is a frequent cause of subareolar abscesses. Goepel and Pahnke and other authors recommend performing surgeries only with concomitant bromocriptine treatment.

== Squamous metaplasia of lactiferous ducts ==
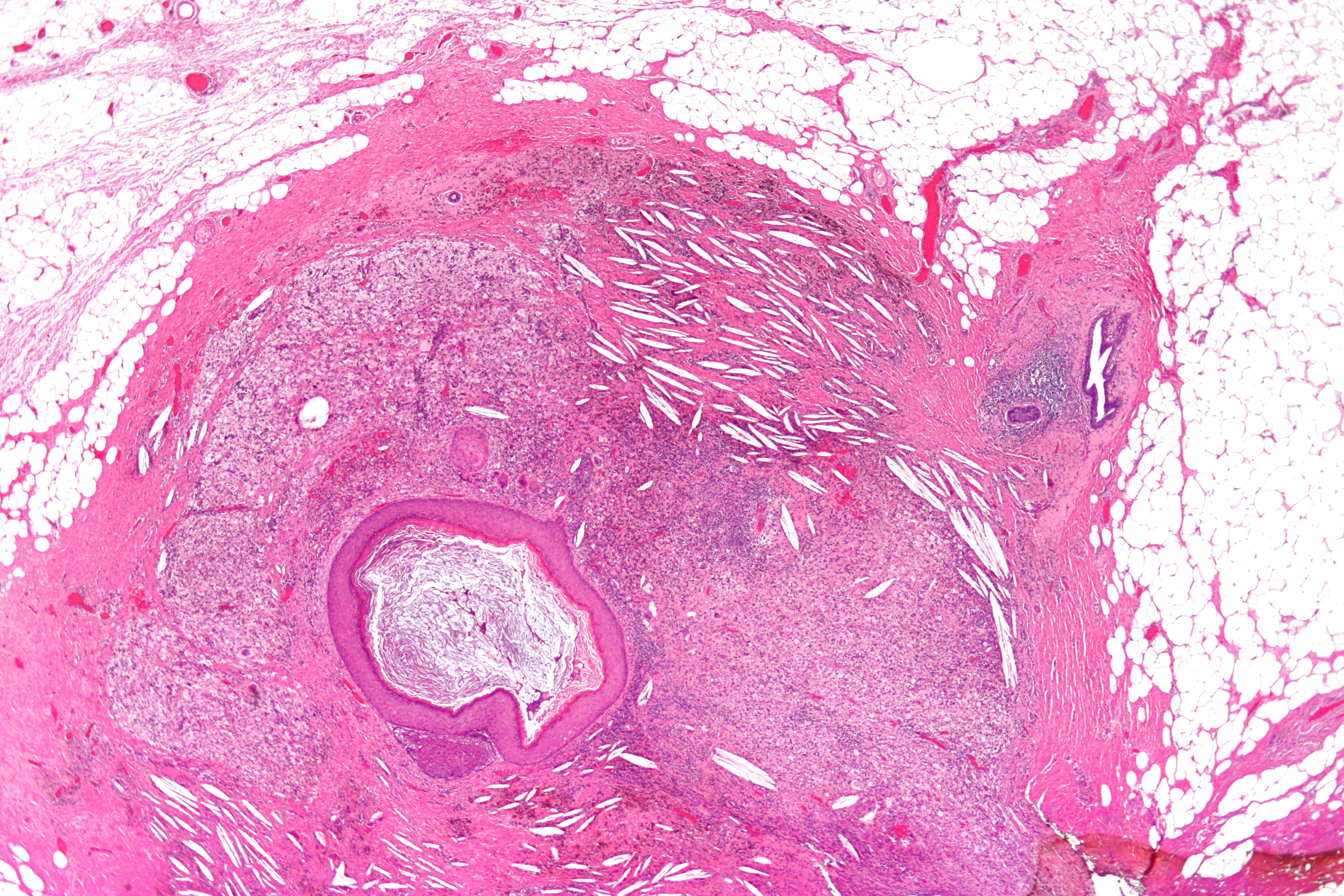
Micrograph of squamous metaplasia of lactiferous ducts. H&E stain.

Squamous metaplasia of lactiferous ducts - abbreviated SMOLD is a change where the normal double layer cuboid epithelium of the lactiferous ducts is replaced by squamous keratinizing cell layers. The resulting epithelium is very similar to normal skin, hence some authors speak of epidermalization. SMOLD is rare in premenopausal women (possibly 0.1-3%) but more frequent (possibly up to 25%) in postmenopausal women where it does not cause any problems at all.

SMOLD appears to be a completely benign lesion and may exist without causing any symptoms. In principle it ought to be completely reversible as the classification as metaplasia would suggest. Because of difficulties in observing the actual changes and rare incidence of the lesion this does not appear to be documented.

The last section of the lactiferous ducts is always lined with squamous keratinizing epithelium which appears to have important physiological functions. For example, the keratin forms plugs sealing the duct entry and has bacteriostatic properties. In SMOLD the keratinizing lining which is supposed to form only the ends of the lactiferous ducts extends deep into the ducts.

SMOLD is distinct from squamous metaplasia that may occur in papilomatous hyperplasia. It is believed to be unrelated to squamous cell carcinoma of the breast which probably arises from different cell types.

The keratin plugs (debris) produced by SMOLD have been proposed as the cause for recurrent subareolar abscesses by causing secretory stasis. The epidermalized lining has also different permeability than the normal lining, hindering resorption of glandular secretions. The resorption is necessary to dispose of stalled secretions inside the duct - and at least equally important it affects osmotic balance which in turn is an important mechanism in the control of lactogenesis (this is relevant both in puerperal and nonpuerperal mastitis).

While in lactating women this would appear to be a very plausible pathogenesis, there is some uncertainty about the pathogenesis in non-lactating women where breast secretions should be apriori minimal. It appears pathologic stimulation of lactogenesis must be present as well to cause subareolar abscess and treatment success with bromocriptin appears to confirm this as compared to poor success rate of the usual antibiotic and surgical treatments documented by Hanavadi et al.

Further uncertainty in the relation of SMOLD and the subareolar abscess is that squamous metaplasia is very often caused by inflammatory processes. SMOLD could be the cause of the inflammation – or the result of a previous or longstanding inflammation.

SMOLD usually affects multiple ducts and frequently (relative to extremely low absolute prevalence) both breasts hence it is very likely that systemic changes such as hormonal interactions are involved.

At least the following factors have been considered in the aetiology of SMOLD: reactive change to chronic inflammation, systemic hormonal changes, smoking, dysregulation in beta-catenin expression, changes in retinoic acid and vitamin D metabolism or expression.

Vitamin A deficiency may cause epidermilization of the ducts and squamous metaplasia and likely also contributes to infection. Vitamin A deficiency has been observed to cause squamous metaplasia in many types of epithelia. However supplementation with Vitamin A would be beneficial only in exceptional cases because normally the local catabolism of vitamin A will be the regulating factor.

Squamous metaplasia of breast epithelia is known to be more prevalent in postmenopausal women (where it does not cause any problems at all). Staurosporine, a nonspecific protein kinase C inhibitor can induce squamous metaplasia in breast tissue while other known PKC inhibitors did not show this effect. cAMP stimulation can also induce squamous metaplasia.

== Research ==
Multiple imaging modalities may be necessary to evaluate abnormalities of the nipple-areolar complex.

In two studies performed in Japan, high-resolution MRI with a microscopy coil yielding 0.137-mm in-plane resolution has been used to confirm the presence of abscesses, isolated fistulas and inflammation and to reveal their position in order to guide surgery.
