= Galactography =

Form of breast imaging

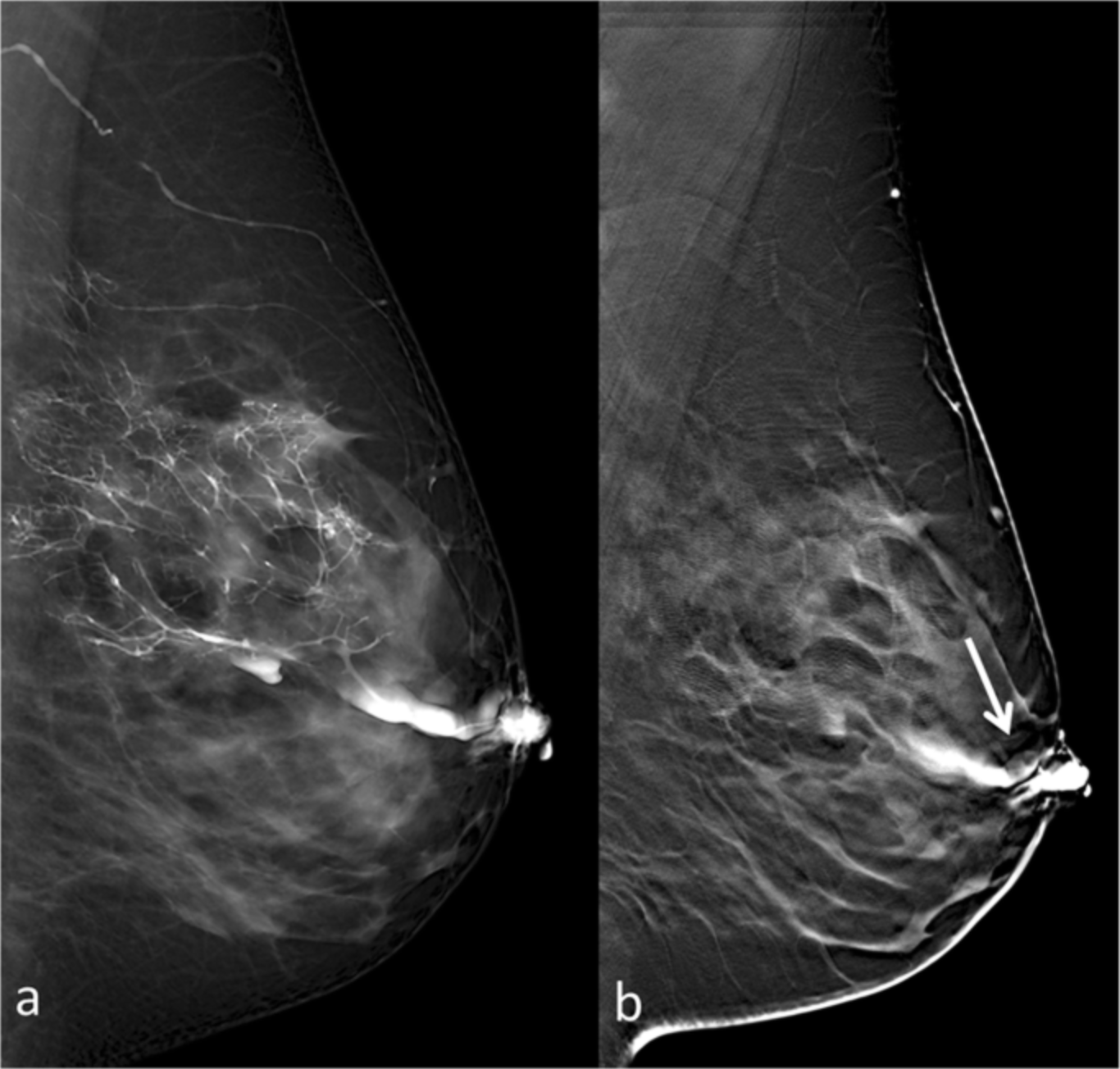
- Full-field digital (FFD)-galactography (left) and Digital breast tomosynthesis (DBT)-galactography (right) showing intraductal papilloma.
- Synonyms: Ductography
- Purpose: diagnostic procedure for viewing the milk ducts.

Galactography or ductography (or galactogram, ductogram) is a medical diagnostic procedure for viewing the milk ducts. The procedure involves the radiography of the ducts after injection of a radiopaque substance into the duct system through the nipple. The procedure is used for investigating the pathology of nipple discharge.

Galactography is capable of detecting smaller abnormalities than mammograms, MRI or ultrasound tests. With galactography, a larger part of the ductal system can be visualized than with the endoscopic investigation of a duct (called galactoscopy or ductoscopy).

Causes for nipple discharge include duct ectasia, intraductal papilloma, and occasionally ductal carcinoma in situ or invasive ductal carcinoma.

The standard treatment of galactographically suspicious breast lesions is to perform a surgical intervention on the concerned duct or ducts: if the discharge clearly stems from a single duct, then the excision of the duct (microdochectomy) is indicated; if the discharge comes from several ducts or if no specific duct could be determined, then a subareolar resection of the ducts (Hadfield's procedure) is performed instead.

To avoid infection, galactography should not be performed when the nipple discharge contains pus.

== See also ==
- Galaxy
