= Acorn cyst sign =

Pattern seen in radiologic examinations

The acorn cyst sign is a radiologic sign indicating the presence of a benign uncomplicated cyst in ultrasound examinations of the breast. It consists of a deep anechoic fluid portion resembling an acorn, and a superficial echogenic layer resembling an acorn cap. This sign is helpful for radiologists to differentiate a benign uncomplicated cyst from a complex mass.
