= Automated whole-breast ultrasound =

Medical imaging technique

- Purpose: obtains volumetric data of breast

Automated whole-breast ultrasound (AWBU) is a medical imaging technique used in radiology to obtain volumetric ultrasound data of the entire breast.

== How it works ==
Similarly to the 3D ultrasound technique used for pregnant women, AWBU allows volumetric image data to be obtained from ultrasound sonography.

With automated whole-breast ultrasound, the ultrasound transducer is guided over the breast in an automatic manner. The position and speed of the transducer is regulated automatically, whereas the angle of incidence and the amount of pressure applied is set by the human operator. The entire breast is scanned in an automated manner, and the procedure yields volumetric image data of the breast. The resulting image data can be read at any convenient time by the radiologist, who is freed from performing the scan.

This allows selected scan planes to be visualized, and also allows the data to be displayed as a volumetric image.

== Applications ==
AWBU has been proposed as an additional cancer screening modality, in particular for women with dense breasts.

Studies have consistently shown an increased detection of breast cancer by supplementary ultrasound screening, compared to mammography alone.

== Comparison to hand-held ultrasound ==
AWBU offers advantages in terms of speed and standardization of ultrasound imaging, rendering the result largely independent of the skill of the operator. Furthermore, the position of any abnormality can be determined relative to the position of the nipple, allowing the same abnormality to be retrieved with precision in follow-up diagnostic procedures and also in biopsy interventions.

However, a number of AWBU techniques employ ultrasound transducers of lower frequency than hand-held ultrasound, resulting in lower spatial and contrast resolution. A disadvantage of AWBU imaging is that it captures static tissue features and does not show the dynamic images properties that can often be seen in images obtained from hand-held ultrasound devices.

== Research ==
There have been preliminary investigations into the use of AWBU for performing ultrasound-guided biopsy. Also, algorithms for (semi-)automatic evaluation of the acquired image data are under development.

== See also ==
- Breast ultrasound
