= Witch's milk =

Milk secreted from the breasts of some newborn human infants of either sex

Witch's milk or neonatal milk is milk secreted from the breasts of some newborn human infants of either sex. Production of neonatal milk by infants usually resolves itself and does not require treatment unless it is caused by an underlying condition or medications. It is thought to be caused by the exposure to an elevated level of estrogen to infants during pregnancy or decreased exposure of estrogen to infants after birth. Its production also may be caused by certain medications. The composition of neonatal milk is similar to maternal milk for most of their components except for fats and one type of antibody.

Neonatal milk production occurs in about 6% of newborns with age from 0 to 12 weeks. Within the age range, infants age 0 to 2 weeks were found to have the highest occurrence. Compared to those who did not have neonatal milk production, infants who did had larger breast nodules. Pre-term infants under the gestational age of 34 weeks did not secrete milk as observed in one study. Complications such as mastitis and abscesses are associated with breast massage of the neonate's breast. Squeezing of neonate's breast could also result in an infection. Blood from the nipples is nearly always benign and frequently associated with duct ectasia; it should only be investigated when it is unilateral.

The name witch's milk originates from ancient folklore and is associated with religious and cultural interpretations.

== Lactation physiology ==
The hormone prolactin has a key role in lactation and breast development in the human body and it is also a functional component of homeostasis. It has varying originations including the central nervous system (CNS), the immune system, mammary glands, and uterus. Development and introduction of any of the following contributes to its production as well: thyrotropin releasing hormone (TRH), estrogen, and dopamine antagonists.

However, the pituitary gland is a primary source for the synthesis and secretion of prolactin. Prolactin's primary functions are breast milk production and mammary gland development. Prolactin has a stimulating effect on alveoli within the mammary glands causing the production of milk that consists of lactose, casein, and lipids. The anterior region of the pituitary gland, more specifically, houses an increasingly abundant number of lactotrophs (stimulated within the physiology of pregnancy) that synthesize prolactin for secretion. The rise of lactotroph proliferation is attributed to growing estrogen levels within a pregnant individual. Connecting to the pituitary gland via the infundibular stalk, is the hypothalamus of which is the primary regulator of prolactin production. The dopamine the hypothalamus releases has an inhibitory effect on lactotrophs, controlling its prolactin secretion. The serum levels of prolactin are typically low in males and non-lactating females, inhibiting possibility for breastmilk production. In the cases that the serum levels of prolactin do become high in these individuals, the phenomenon galactorrhea is to occur.

== Witch's milk pathophysiology ==
=== Hyperprolactinemia ===
Witch's milk, or neonatal galactorrhea, in newborns is primarily caused by hyperprolactinemia - abnormally high level of prolactin hormone. Please note that galactorrhea and hyperprolactinemia physiologies are independent of one another. There are currently two different mechanisms described in literatures explaining the cause of hyperprolactinemia in neonates. One mechanism states that hyperprolactinemia in neonates results from the decline of maternally transferred estrogen after birth. Decreased estrogen increases production of prolactin which increases milk production. The other mechanism states that hyperprolactinemia in neonates after birth results from their exposure to high maternally transferred estrogen level during pregnancy.

=== Prolactin ===
In breastfeeding, pituitary hormone prolactin vary throughout pregnancy and in different lactation conditions. Prolactin, produced by the pituitary gland, is essential for initiating and maintaining milk production. Its levels increase during pregnancy to prepare the breasts for milk production and remain high after childbirth to continue supporting breastfeeding. Issues related to abnormal lactation, such as inadequate milk supply or galactorrhea, an excessive milk flow not linked to childbirth, are also explored. Fluctuations in prolactin levels can significantly influence these problems. By analyzing prolactin levels in various lactation situations, insights are provided into how changes in prolactin affect milk production and overall lactation health. This emphasizes the importance of understanding prolactin's role for better diagnosis and management of lactation issues, offering valuable information for treating both normal and problematic lactation cases.

=== Medications ===
Medications are a significant cause of hyperprolactinemia and galactorrhea. They can disrupt the normal regulation of prolactin by either inhibiting dopamine, which naturally suppresses prolactin secretion, or by directly stimulating the release of prolactin. Opiates are among these medications. They can elevate prolactin levels by inhibiting dopamine release, reducing the dopamine-mediated suppression of prolactin, thus leading to increased prolactin levels and possibly causing galactorrhea. The use of opiates by mothers during pregnancy or breastfeeding can transfer these drugs to the infant, potentially leading to neonatal galactorrhea, also known as "witch's milk."

=== Prolactinoma ===
A tumor originating in the pituitary gland is one cause of galactorrhea. This pituitary tumor, prolactinoma, results in an overproduction of prolactin, or hyperprolactinemia. This type of cause is classified under organic hyperprolactinemia. In pregnancy, the lactotroph production increases through means of cellular proliferation of which gives rise to potential for neoplastic development. This is especially true in cases where this proliferation becomes uncontrollable. In patients of varying ages who present with hyperprolactinemia, 12-70% of them have been diagnosed with prolactinoma.

=== Thyrotoxicosis ===
Changes in estrogen levels attributed to alterations in metabolism, for example, result in thyrotoxicosis which also leads to galactorrhea. This type of cause is classified under functional hyperprolactinemia. When estrogen levels rise in the placental-fetal circulation, breast enlargement in breastfed infants occurs temporarily but also has the potential to last longer in some cases.

== Complications ==
Witch's milk can last about 6 months then usually resolves on its own. However, the breast area may become red, tender, or swollen, which is an indication that an infectious complication may have risen. It was reported that the most common bacteria that causes these complications is Staphylococcus aureus. This was shown in one study that out of 32 of the 36 participants was shown to have an infection in their breast due to Staph. aureus. It is believed that such infection occurs when bacteria from the skin enters into the breast. The act of removal of the witch's milk by exploiting the neonatal's breast and breast tissue can allow bacteria to grow and cause the complications such as mastitis and breast abscesses. On the other hand, breast enlargement can occur due to hormone imbalances that occur before birth, such as mastauxe. This can lead to neonatal galactorrhea or witch's milk.

=== Mastitis ===
One problem that can arise from the infection of Staphylococcus aureus in the breast is mastitis. Among infants, mastitis occurs more frequently in full-term females and infants under the age of 5 weeks. Additionally, Staphylococcus aureus causes about 85% of cases encounter. However, other bacteria such as gram-negative enteric bacteria, anaerobes, and Group B Streptococcus can be the cause of the neonatal mastitis. The clinical presentation of mastitis can manifest has painful, swelling, and an abscess can form after 4 weeks. Mastitis can occur in one of the breast but in some cases it can occur in both breasts of the neonate. Treatment can be done by using an aggressive course of antibiotics if treated right away and upon diagnosis, which was shown to be 50% effective. Surgical interventions for drainage and abscess removal may be required if infection progresses. Untreated mastitis can lead to further consequences such as cellulitis, fasciitis, and sepsis.

=== Giant mastauxe ===
Mastauxe is derived from two Greek words 'mastos' (breasts) and 'auxein' (increase in size). Mastauxe is breast enlargement that is characterized by the increase in diameter size of breast buds that is larger than 3 cm. This phenomenon is not fully understood today but it is said to be caused by the transfer of maternal estrogens or the decrease of estrogens in the late stages of pregnancy. The differentiation between mastitis or breast abscess should be established by certain labs or test, such as ultrasonography and laboratory findings. These laboratory findings include white blood cell count and C-reactive protein levels. This condition resolves on its own through continuous observation and reassurance.

== Case studies and reports ==
=== Hormone ===
A 13-day old male infant with bilateral breast enlargement from birth accompanied with recent development of witch's milk presents to the outpatient facility. Upon physical examination, the infant was found to have normal vitals such as heart rate and body temperature. In addition, blood tests, ultrasound, and physical examination found no evidence of complications such as breast abscess. Therefore, the patient was diagnosed with giant mastauxe. Breast enlargement and witch's milk found in this patient was believed to be caused by either the exposure to estrogen during pregnancy or the reduced estrogen exposure postnatally. Neither the patient nor the mother took any medication that could contribute to the infant's breast development. Prior to their presentation to the outpatient facility, the mother did attempt chest manipulation trying to reduce the breast size.

=== Medication ===
A rare case of infant galactorrhea associated with maternal use of antidepressants has been reported. A 3-month-old infant developed nipple lesions and milk production. Initially, the condition was thought to be an infection due to excessive handling. However, repeated episodes prompted further investigation by a mastologist, who suggested that the galactorrhea could be linked to the mother's antidepressant medication, specifically sertraline and quetiapine. Although these medications are generally considered safe during breastfeeding, they can still affect the infant. This case highlights the importance of considering this rare but possible side effect when diagnosing persistent galactorrhea in infants. It underscores the need for thorough monitoring and assessment of potential drug impacts on infants, particularly when common explanations for symptoms do not apply.

=== Congenital heart failure ===
A 16-day old male infant was treated with congenital heart failure presented with bilateral breast enlargement and witch's milk. After 3 weeks of heart failure treatment, although he did not show any improvement for heart failure, the breast returned to normal size and no witch's milk was observed. Within the period of treatment, the infant's prolactin level showed a trend with both decrease and increase ending with an elevated level. The estrogen level was lower at the end of the 3 week period compared to the beginning, but still remained at an elevated level. It was proposed that both high level of estrogen due to the decreased metabolism of estrogen resulted from heart failure and the high sensitivity of the infant's breast toward estrogen contribute to the development of breast enlargement and high level of prolactin for witch's milk.

== Cultural interpretations ==
The term "witch's milk" comes from ancient folklore that stems from the 17th century belief that the fluid leaking from a newborn's nipple was a source of nourishment for witches' familiar spirits. Across Europe, neonatal lactation was called "witch's milk", "Hexenmilch" and "lait de sorciere", and it was accused of being a potential source for witchcraft.

Some communities believed that women who has sold their souls to Satan in return for mystical powers would persecute babies by sucking their mammary glands and leaving "witches' marks". This sinister association led to widespread fear and superstitions surrounding the condition of Galactorrhea. It was commonly thought to be stolen from unwatched, sleeping infants. This added more fear and anxiety which further intertwined the medical condition with supernatural fears.

There is also a religious interpretation behind the significance of witch's milk. In the 1500s in England, milk was symbolically linked with nurture and purity, and was particularly associated with the Virgin Mary. However, the symbolism behind milk might be different amongst different religions. For instance, in ancient Egyptian religion, milk was a sacrificial offering as a form of libation to gods and where resurrections are associated with the milk of goddesses. Milk would often be used as a ritual offering in various other societies as well including Mesopotamia, Egypt, India, and Europe. In Egypt specifically, milk was rarely consumed by adults but as in the case of early Mesopotamia, was drunk only by children or used in religious ceremonies because of how scarce milk was. However, when the milk came out of so-called "unnatural" places, it was either seen as divine or satanic.

The cultural interpretations of witch's milk vary significantly across different cultures, influencing how parents address the condition when their child has galactorrhea. For instance, in India, there is an age-old practice in place where mothers would squeeze the swollen breasts of infants that contained witch's milk in an attempt to prevent the development of large breasts, which are considered inappropriate before the age of marriage. This practice, rooted in cultural beliefs and superstitions, contrasts with modern medical advice which strongly discourages such actions of squeezing the milk out of the breasts because it increases the risk of infections such as mastitis. Similar practices have been observed in various cultures where traditional beliefs and medical knowledge intersect. This highlights why understanding the cultural nuances behind approaches to care is crucial for providing culturally sensitive healthcare and education to parents. Since so many cultures may have different customs when it comes to addressing galactorrhea, it is important to talk to the patient about the significance they place on "witch's milk". This will help dismantle clinical barriers that result from patient and provider interactions clouded by sociocultural differences. When these barriers are not identified, accepted, or understood, it can lead to mistrust, dissatisfaction, decreased adherence, and poorer health outcomes. Making an effort to understand the cultural interpretations behind conditions such as galactorrhea can help bridge the gaps in care that many minority groups face when compared to their white counterparts considering that cultural competence from healthcare staff has been shown to improve general healthcare system quality.

== Comparison to adolescent galactorrhea ==
"Witch's milk" and adolescent galactorrhea are both forms of abnormal milk production, but they differ significantly in terms of age group, causes, and management. Witch's milk occurs in newborns and is typically due to maternal hormones that cross the placenta during pregnancy. These hormones can stimulate the infant's mammary glands to produce milk, a condition that is relatively common, affecting about 5% of newborns. Witch's milk is usually self-limiting and resolves within a few weeks as the maternal hormones dissipate from the infant's system. Parents are advised not to express the milk, as this can stimulate further production, and no specific treatment is generally required.

In contrast, adolescent galactorrhea occurs in teenagers and involves the production of milk in individuals who are not pregnant or breastfeeding. The causes of adolescent galactorrhea are varied and can include multiple factors. A common cause is hormonal imbalances, particularly high levels of prolactin, a hormone produced by the pituitary gland that regulates milk production. Excessive prolactin can lead to milk production even when it's not warranted. Certain medications can also play a role; for example, antipsychotics might disrupt dopamine regulation, resulting in elevated prolactin levels. Similarly, antidepressants and some antihypertensives can have comparable effects.

Disorders affecting the pituitary gland, such as prolactinomas (benign tumors that produce too much prolactin), are another potential cause. Hypothyroidism, characterized by an underactive thyroid gland, can also lead to higher prolactin levels and contribute to the condition. Chronic kidney disease may affect the body's hormonal balance, potentially leading to elevated prolactin and galactorrhea. In some cases, no clear cause is identified, and the condition is labeled idiopathic.

Adolescent galactorrhea is less frequent than witch's milk, which usually occurs in newborns. However, it can signal an underlying medical issue that needs to be addressed. The condition may persist until the root cause is diagnosed and treated. To determine the cause, a comprehensive medical evaluation is needed, which could include blood tests, MRI scans to assess the pituitary gland, and a review of the patient's medication history. Treatment depends on the underlying cause and might involve stopping or changing medications, using drugs to correct hormonal imbalances, or addressing pituitary disorders with appropriate treatments. Managing related conditions such as hypothyroidism or chronic kidney disease is also crucial. A thorough and tailored approach is essential to effectively address the factors contributing to adolescent galactorrhea.
