= Squamous metaplasia =

Benign transformation of surface lining cells to a squamous morphology

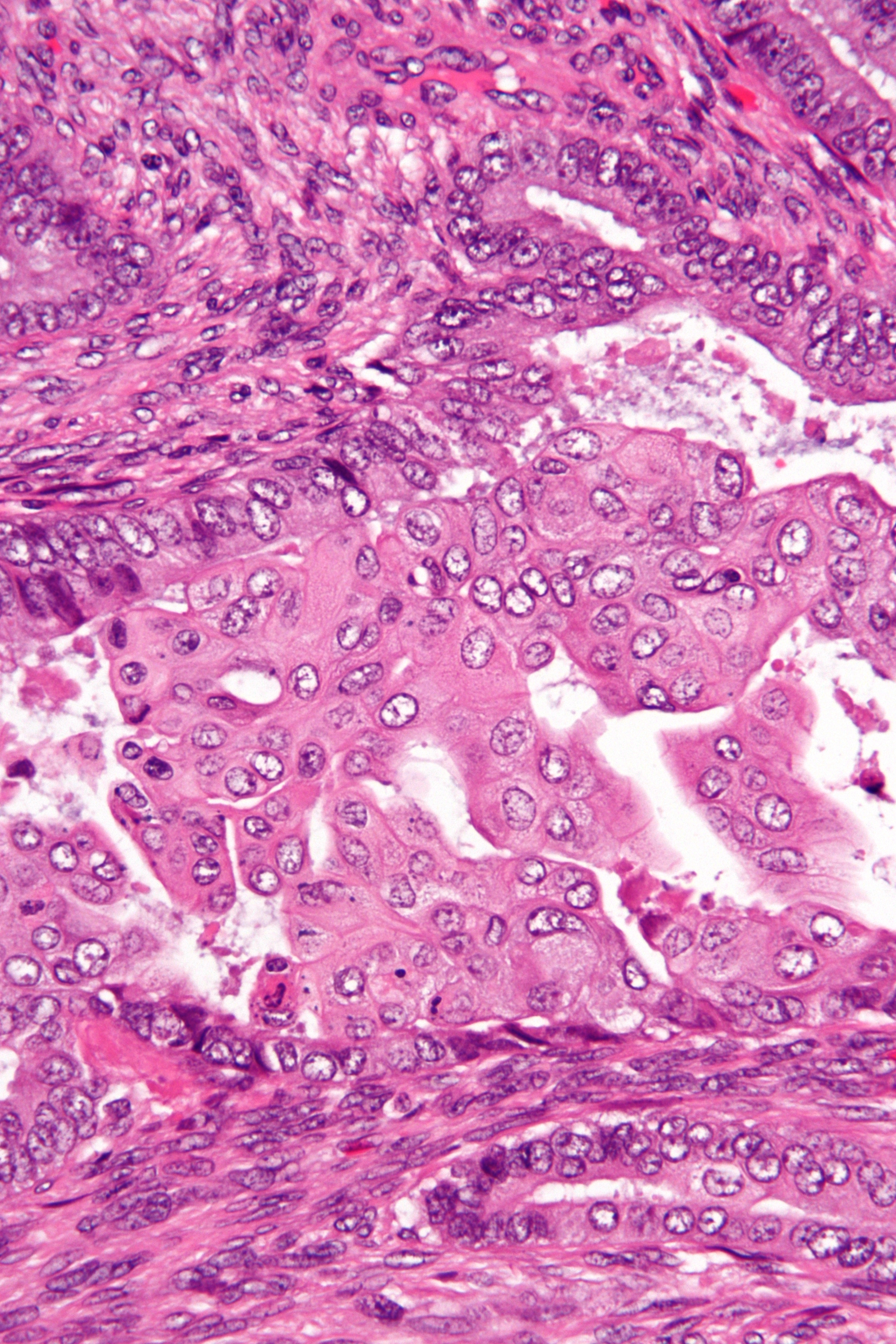
Micrograph showing squamous metaplasia (centre of image) in an atypical polypoid adenomyoma. H&E stain

Squamous metaplasia is a benign non-cancerous change (metaplasia) of surfacing lining cells (epithelium) to a squamous morphology.

== Location ==
Common sites for squamous metaplasia include the bladder and cervix. Smokers often exhibit squamous metaplasia in the linings of their airways. These changes don't signify a specific disease, but rather usually represent the body's response to stress or irritation. Vitamin A deficiency or overdose can also lead to squamous metaplasia.

=== Uterine cervix ===
In regard to the cervix, squamous metaplasia can sometimes be found in the endocervix, as it is composed of simple columnar epithelium, whereas the ectocervix is composed of stratified squamous non-keratinized epithelium.

== Significance ==
Squamous metaplasia may be seen in the context of benign lesions (e.g., atypical polypoid adenomyoma), chronic irritation, or cancer (e.g., endometrioid endometrial carcinoma), as well as pleomorphic adenoma.

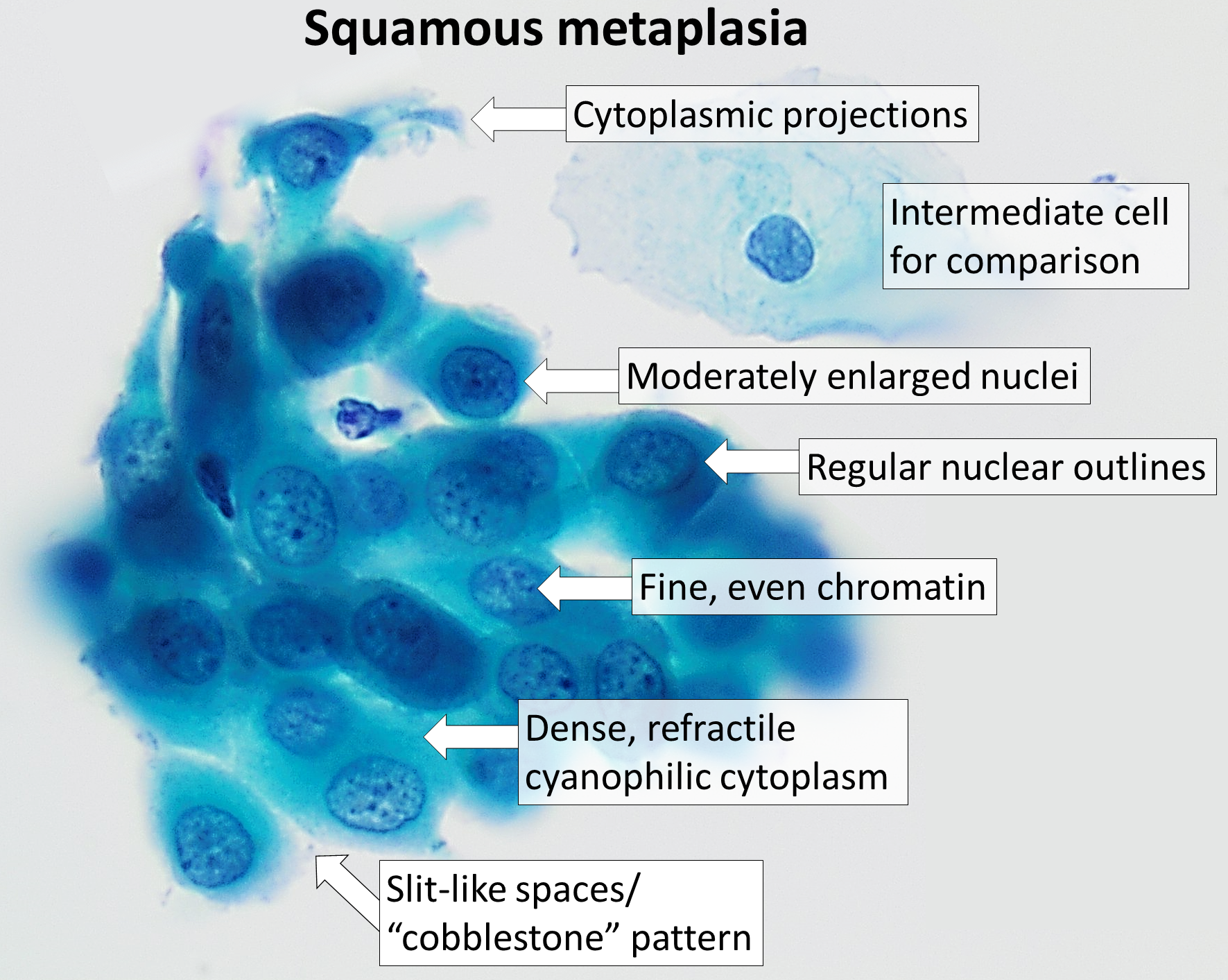
Cytology of squamous metaplasia of the cervix, with typical features. Pap stain.

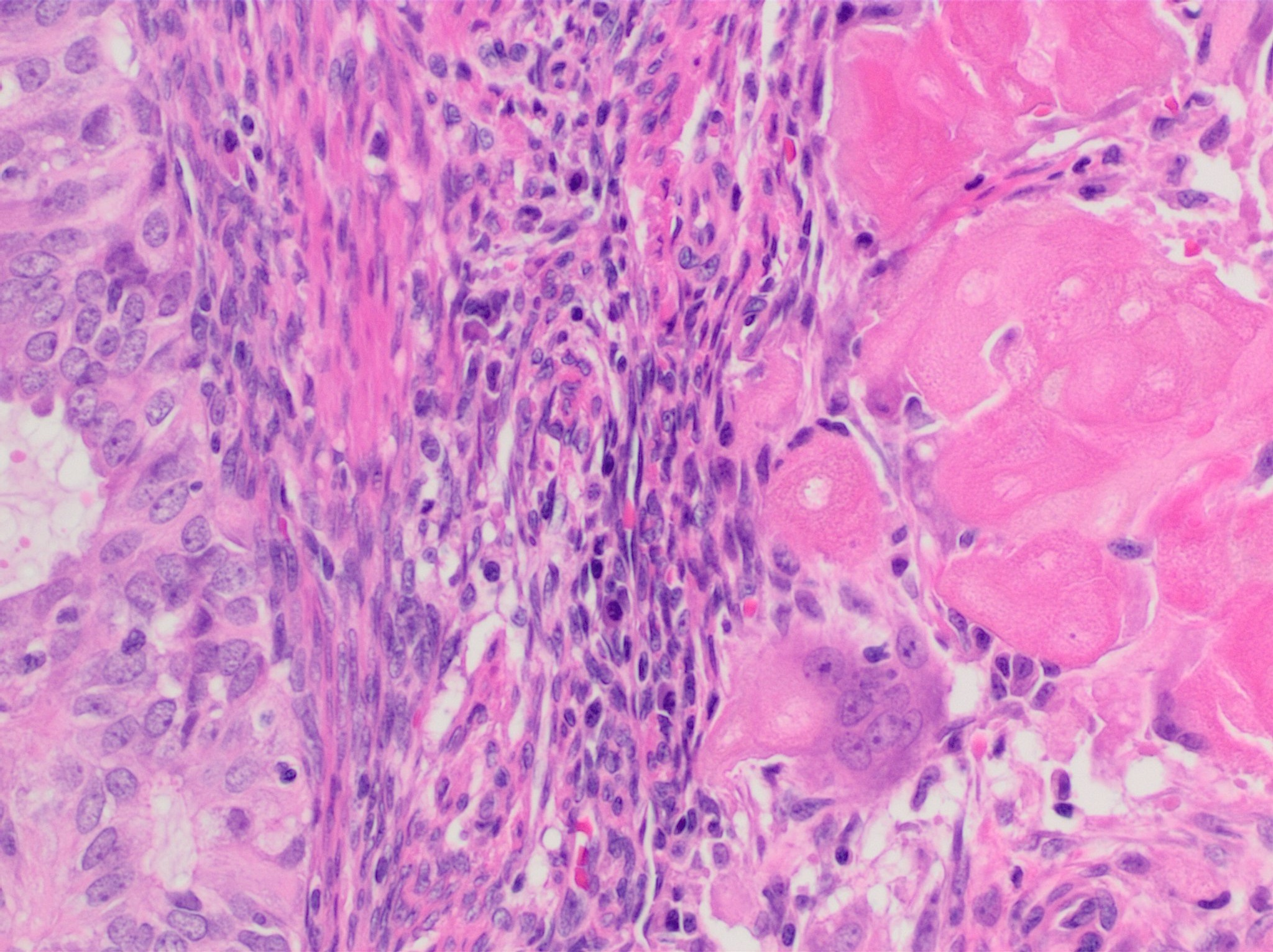
Endometrial adenocarcinoma (carcinoma at left in image) with squamous differentiation evidenced as necrotic “ghost cells” of keratinocytes at right in image, leaving pink keratin as well as clear spaces at the prior locations of the cell nuclei.

== See also ==
- Metaplasia
- Dysplasia
- Barrett esophagus - a columnar cell metaplasia of squamous epithelium
- Subareolar abscess
