= Intraductal papilloma =

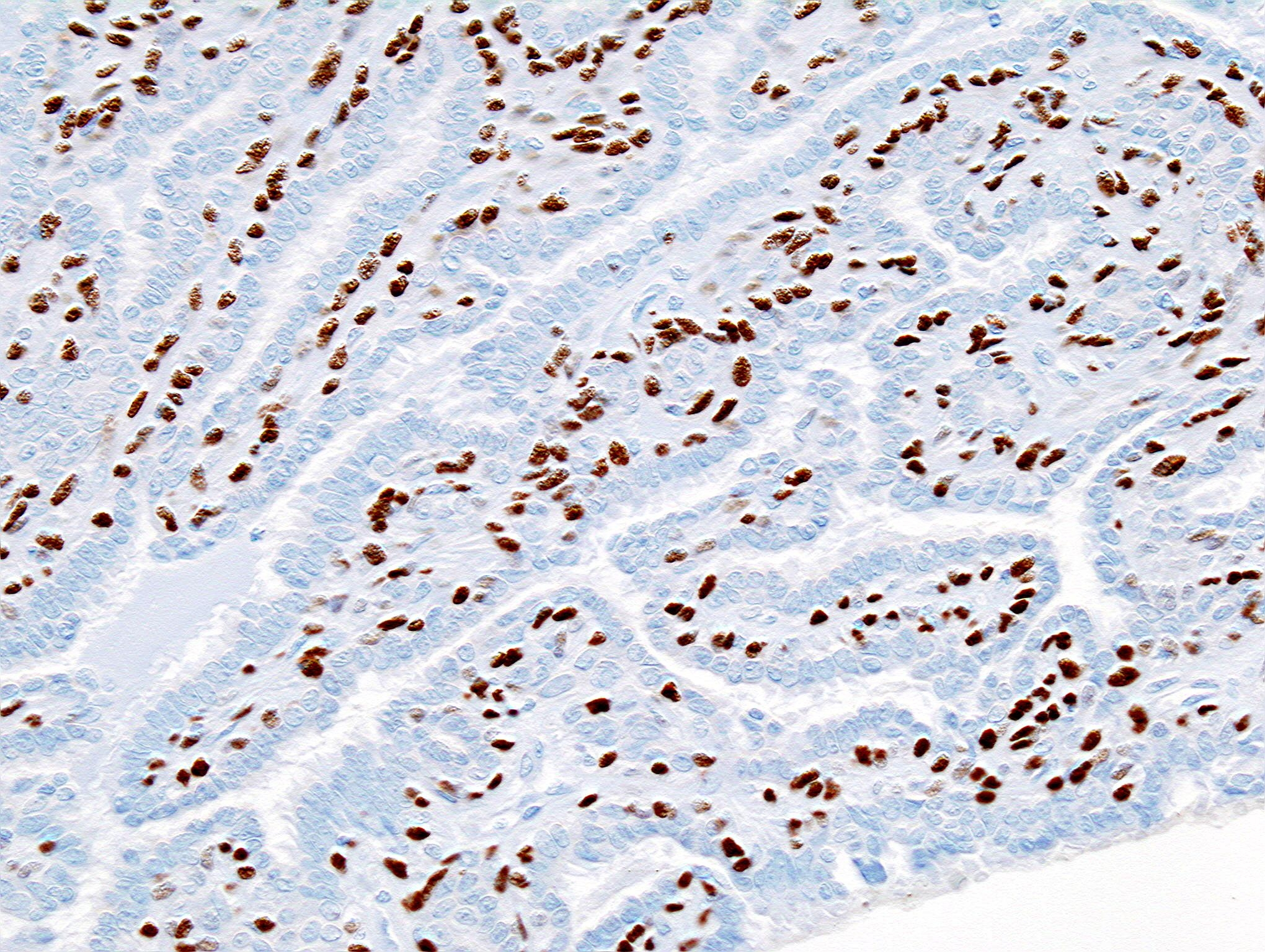
- Histopathology of intraductal papilloma of the breast by excisional biopsy. Immunostaining for p63 protein.
- Specialty: Oncology

Intraductal papillomas of the breast are benign lesions with an incidence of approximately 2-3% in humans. They result from abnormal proliferation of the epithelial cells lining the breast ducts.

Two types of intraductal papillomas are generally distinguished. The central type develops near the nipple. They are usually solitary and often arise in the years nearing menopause. On the other hand, the peripheral type are often multiple papillomas arising at the peripheral ducts, and are usually found in younger women. The peripheral type are associated with a higher risk of malignancy.

They are the most common cause of bloody nipple discharge in women age 20-40 and generally do not show up on mammography due to their small size. They may be detectable on ultrasound. A galactogram is the most definitive test but is somewhat invasive.

The masses are often too small to be palpated or felt. A galactogram is therefore necessary to diagnose the type of lesion.

Excision is sometimes performed. Microdochectomy/microdochotomy (removal of a breast duct) is the treatment of choice.

== Additional images ==
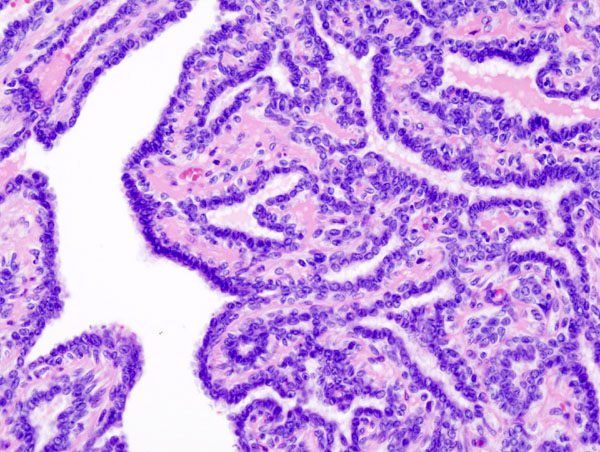
Histopathology of intraductal papilloma of the breast by excisional biopsy. Hematoxylin and eosin stain.

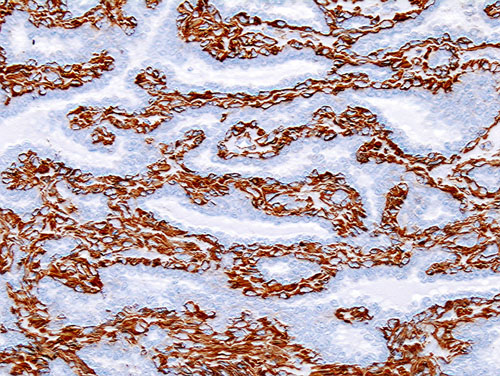
Histopathology of intraductal papilloma of the breast by excisional biopsy. Immunostaining for alpha-smooth muscle actin.

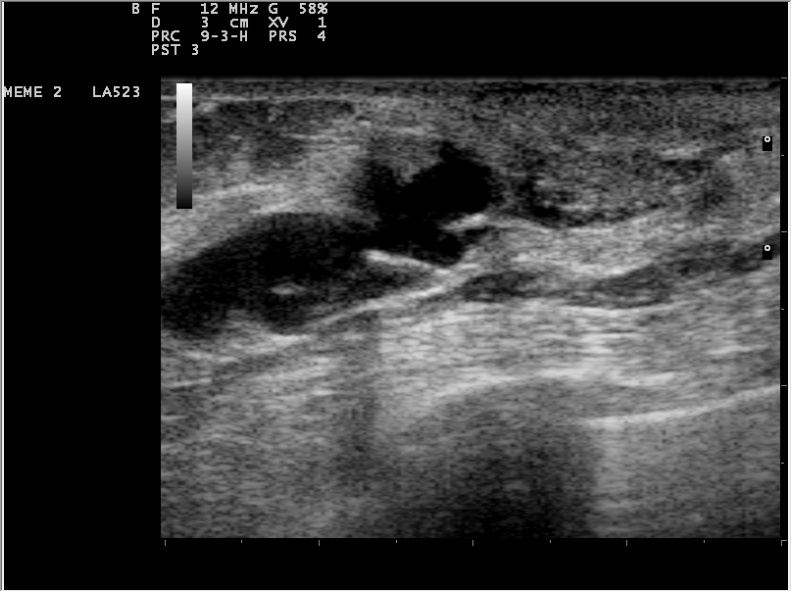

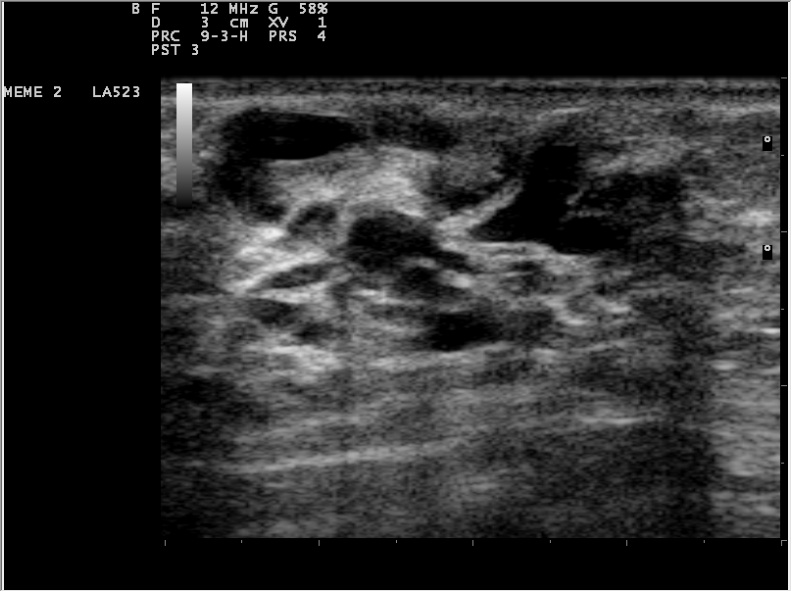

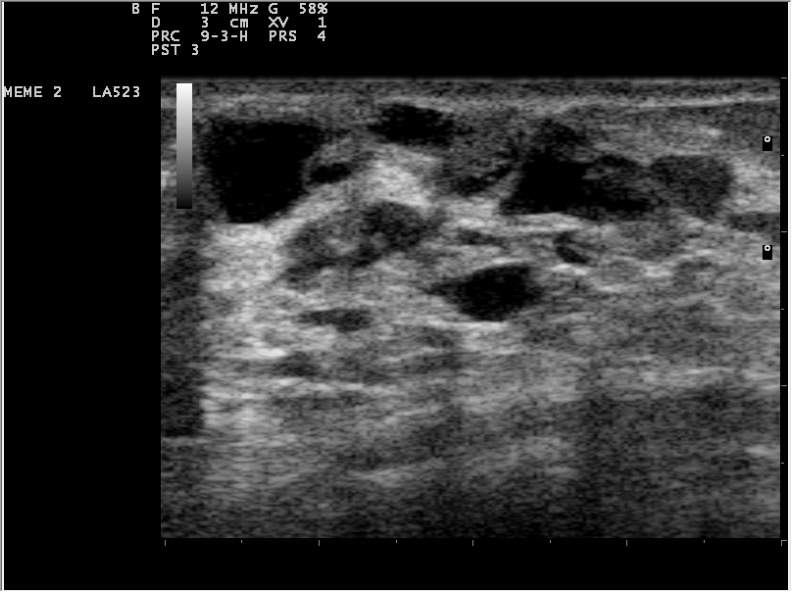

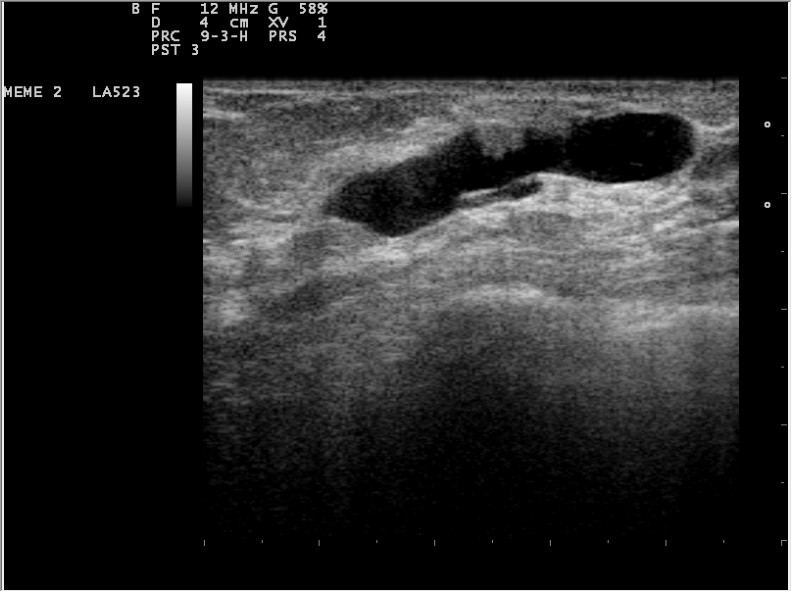

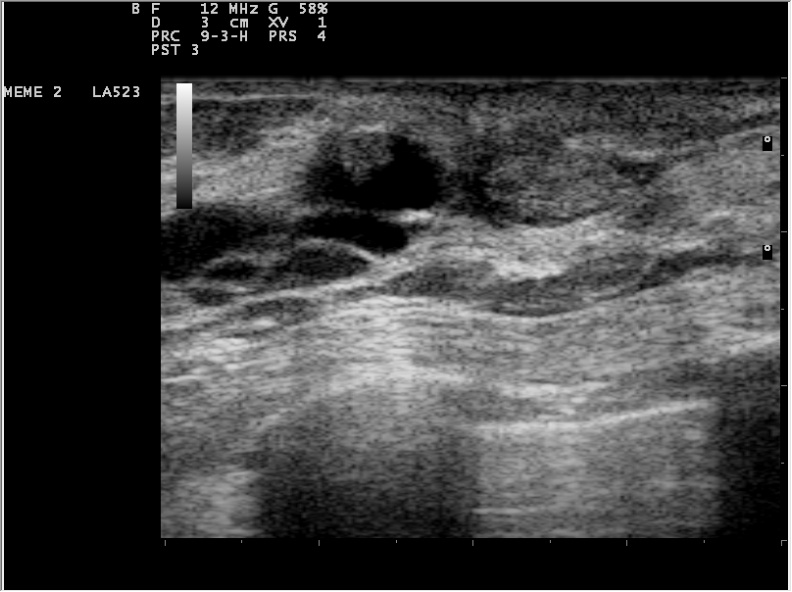

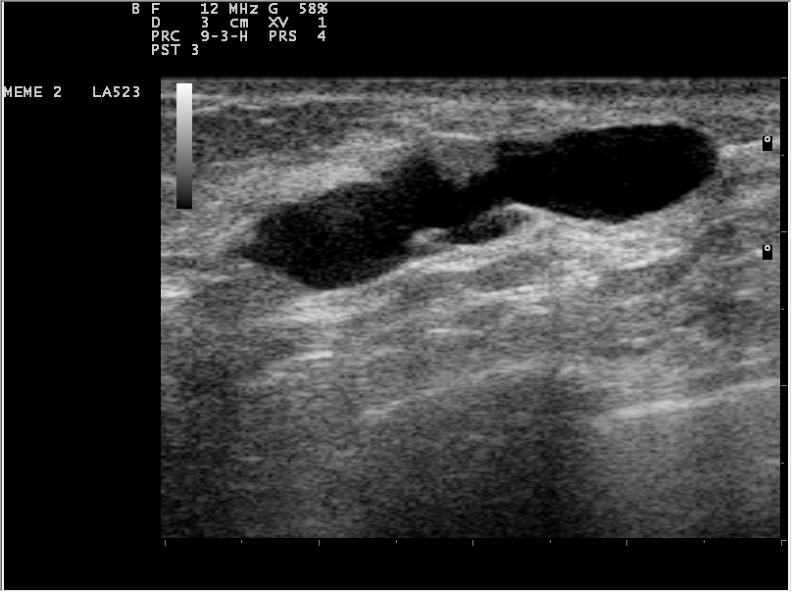
