= Breast ultrasound =

Type of medical imaging

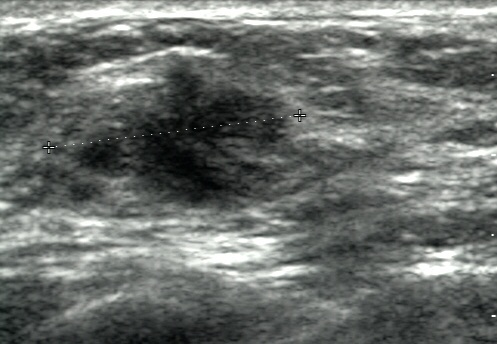
- Cancer ultrasound image
- ICD-10-PCS: BH4
- ICD-9-CM: 88.73
- MeSH: D016217

Breast ultrasound is a medical imaging technique that uses medical ultrasonography to perform imaging of the breast. It can be performed for either diagnostic or screening purposes and can be used with or without a mammogram. In particular, breast ultrasound may be useful for younger women who have denser fibrous breast tissue that may make mammograms more challenging to interpret.

Automated whole-breast ultrasound (AWBU) is a technique that produces volumetric images of the breast and is largely independent of operator skill. It utilizes high-frequency ultrasound to help perform a diagnostic evaluation of the lactiferous ducts (duct sonography) and make dilated ducts and intraductal masses visible. Galactography is another technique that can be used to visualize the system of lactiferous ducts and allows a wider area to be visualized.

Elastography is a type of ultrasound examination that measures tissue stiffness and can be used to detect tumours. Breast ultrasound is also used to perform fine-needle aspiration biopsy and ultrasound-guided fine-needle aspiration of breast abscesses.

Women may prefer breast ultrasound over mammography because it is a painless procedure and does not involve the discomfort of breast compression present in mammograms.

Breast ultrasound is typically performed using a frequency of 7 to 14 Megahertz, and may also include ultrasound of the axillary tail of the breast and axillae to detect abnormal nodes in the axilla, as lymphatic drainage of parts of the breast occurs through axillary lymph nodes.

== See also ==
- Acorn cyst sign
