= Duct ectasia of breast =

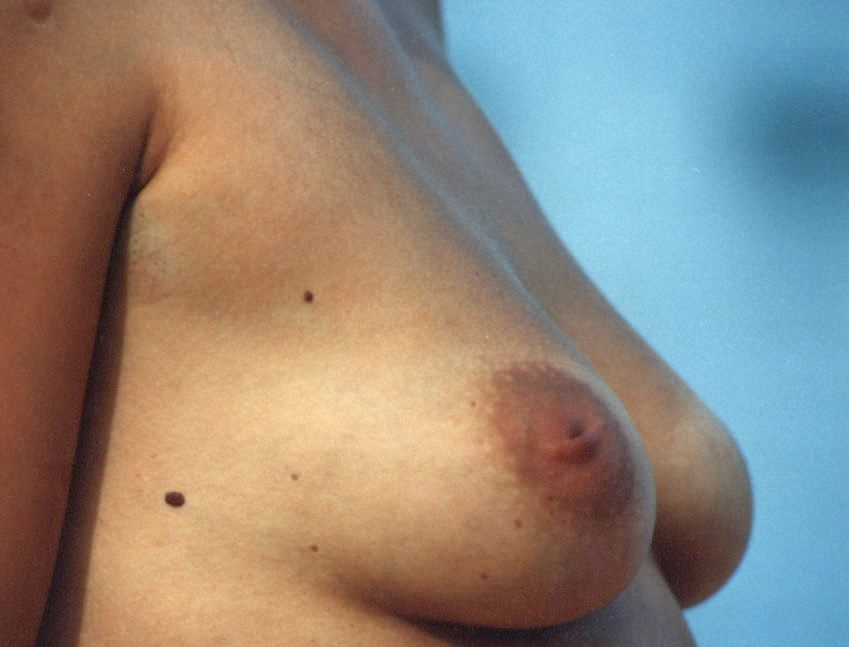
- One of the symptoms of mammary duct ectasia is inverted nipples.
- Specialty: General surgery
- Symptoms: nipple retraction, inversion, pain, green-brown discharge
- Complications: nipple discharge, breast discomfort, infection, concern about breast cancer
- Causes: Aging, smoking, inverted nipples
- Diagnostic method: duct widening
- Differential diagnosis: mammary duct ectasia, plasma cell mastitis, breast cancer

Duct ectasia of the breast, mammary duct ectasia or plasma cell mastitis is a condition that occurs when a milk duct beneath the nipple widens, the duct walls thicken, and the duct fills with fluid. This is the most common cause of greenish discharge. Mammary duct ectasia can mimic breast cancer. It is a disorder of peri- or post-menopausal age.

Duct ectasia syndrome is a synonym for nonpuerperal mastitis, but the term has also been occasionally used to describe special cases of fibrocystic diseases or mastalgia or as a wastebasket definition of benign breast disease.

Correlation of duct widening with the "classical" symptoms of duct ectasia syndrome is unclear. However, duct widening was recently very strongly correlated with noncyclic breast pain.

Duct diameter is naturally variable, subject to hormonal interactions. Duct ectasia syndrome in the classical meaning is associated with additional histological changes.

== Symptoms ==
Signs of duct ectasia can include nipple retraction, inversion, pain, and various intermittent couloring discharge (ranging from white, to green/black, to grey). Other symptoms include a palpable breast lump. Duct ectasia may also be asymptomatic.

== Causes ==
Breasts are made up of fibrous connective tissues, which are made up of cells, fibers and a gel-like substance.

== Pathogenesis ==
The duct widening is commonly believed to be a result of secretory stasis, including stagnant colostrum, which also causes periductal inflammation and fibrosis. However, because nonspecific duct widening is common it might be also coincidental finding in many processes.

Smokers seem more often affected by duct ectasia syndrome although the reported results are not entirely consistent. The correlation with smoking status appears weaker than for subareolar abscess. Correlation with the actual duct widening is not known.

Both duct widening and duct ectasia syndrome are frequently bilateral, hence systemic causes are likely involved.

== Diagnosis ==
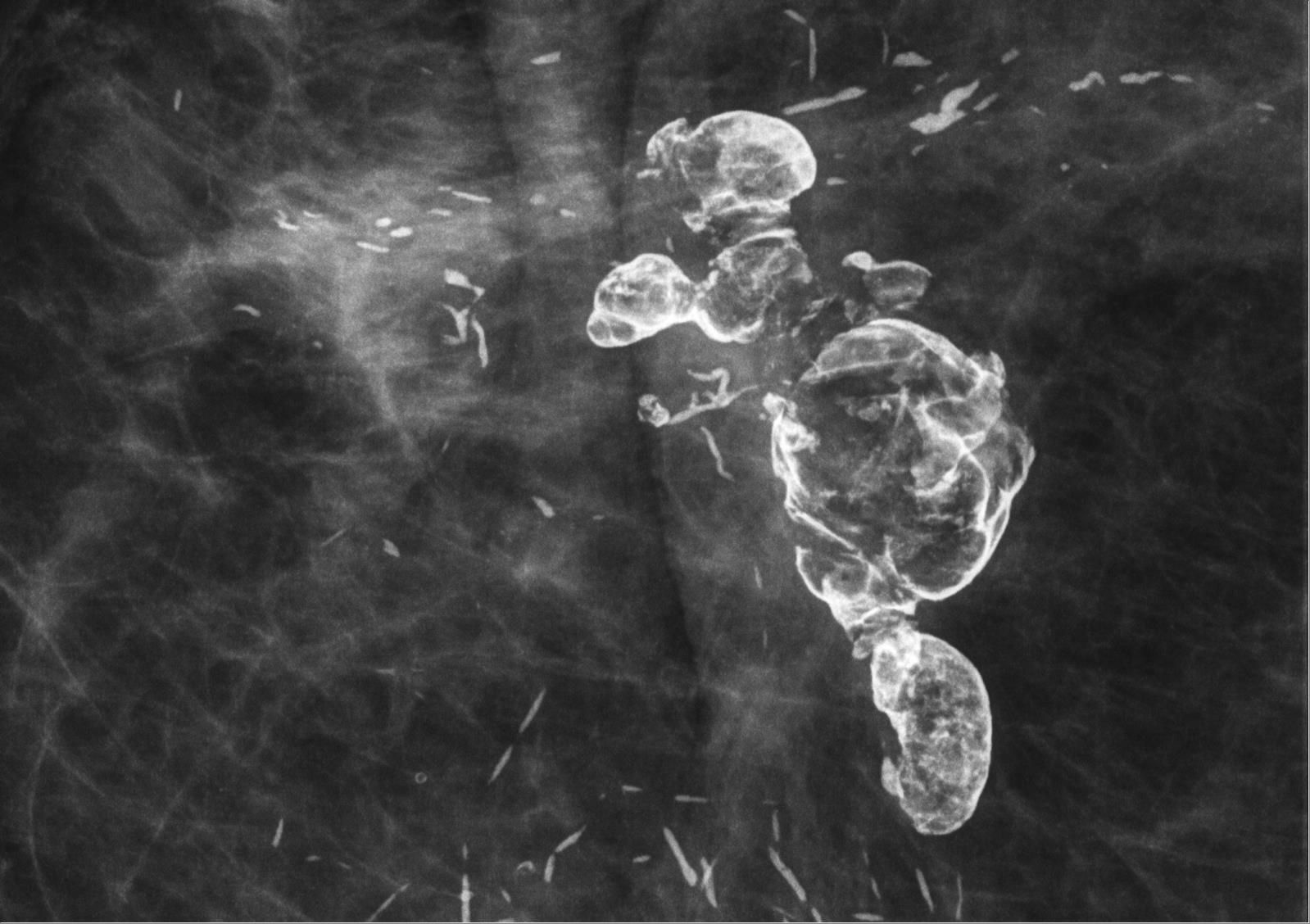
Detail of a mammography showing liponecrosis (round/oval calcifications) and plasma cell mastitis with typical rod-like calcifications

Noninvasive methods to determine duct diameter in live patients are available only recently and it is not clear how the results should be compared with older results from biopsies.

Histologically, dilation of the large duct is prominent. Duct widening with associated periductal fibrosis is frequently included in the wastebasket definition of fibrocystic disease.

In plasma cell rich lesions diagnosed on core biopsies, steroid-responsive IgG4-related mastitis can be identified by IgG/IgG4 immunostaining.

== Duct Ectasia Syndrome ==
The term duct ectasia syndrome has been used to describe symptoms of nonpuerperal mastitis, possibly associated with nipple inversion and nipple discharge. In some contexts, it was used to describe a particular form of nonpuerperal mastitis coincident with fibrocystic disease, frequently involving pasty (coloured) nipple discharge, nipple retraction, retroareolar abscess and blue dome cysts. Abscessation is not very frequent but by some definitions recurrent subareolar abscess is merely a variant of duct ectasia syndrome - abscessation would be obviously more frequent with this definition.

Duct ectasia syndrome has been associated with histopathological findings that are distinct from a simple duct widening. In addition to nonspecific duct widening the myoepithelial cell layer is atrophic, missing or replaced by fibrous tissue. The original cuboidal epithelial layer may be also severely impaired or missing. Characteristic calcifications are often visible on mammographic images.

Periductal mastitis, comedo mastitis, secretory disease of the breast, plasma cell mastitis and mastitis obliterans are sometimes considered special cases or synonyms of duct ectasia syndrome.

== Prognosis ==
The condition is usually self-limiting, and thus not indicated for surgery.

== Terminology ==
The term has several meanings on histological and symptomatic levels and on both levels usage overlaps with mastalgia, fibrocystic disease and specific sub- or superclasses of nonpuerperal mastitis. While this is not ideal for a definition it results from actual usage in international literature. Because research literature regarding duct ectasia is anything but abundant it is probably easiest to determine the exact meaning(s) intended by the respective authors on a case-by-case basis and this section can offer only a few hints.

Typical usage in North America is a synonym of nonpuerperal mastitis, including the special cases of granulomatous mastitis, comedo mastitis, subareolar abscess with or without squamous metaplasia of lactiferous ducts and fistulation.

Simple duct widening should be carefully distinguished from more complex histological changes.
