= Ductoscopy =

Medical diagnostic procedure

- Purpose: collecting epithelial cells from milk ducts

Ductoscopy or mammary ductoscopy (also: breast duct endoscopy, galactoscopy) is a medical diagnostic procedure for viewing and collecting epithelial cells and other internal features of the milk ducts. It is capable of detecting smaller abnormalities than mammograms, MRI or ultrasound tests.

Ductoscopy can be performed in a physician's office or as an outpatient in a clinic. A fiber optic scope less than a millimeter thick is inserted into the milk duct at the nipple and threaded deep into the breast through the duct. No incision is involved. An imaging system displays the output of the scope on a computer monitor. Samples of epithelial cells can be collected onto microscope slides for further analysis. Local anesthetic may be employed to reduce discomfort.

Latest Mammary Ductoscope, also called Micro Endoscope, is available with the diameter of 0.35 mm. The endoscopes is used along with a 3-way cannula. The other two ports are used for saline irrigation and Biopsy Forceps of 0.4 mm diameter.

Ductoscopy can also be performed in conjunction with a lumpectomy, allowing the surgeon to achieve clean margins with a minimum of excess tissue removed.
