= Lactiferous duct =

Structure carrying milk to the nipple

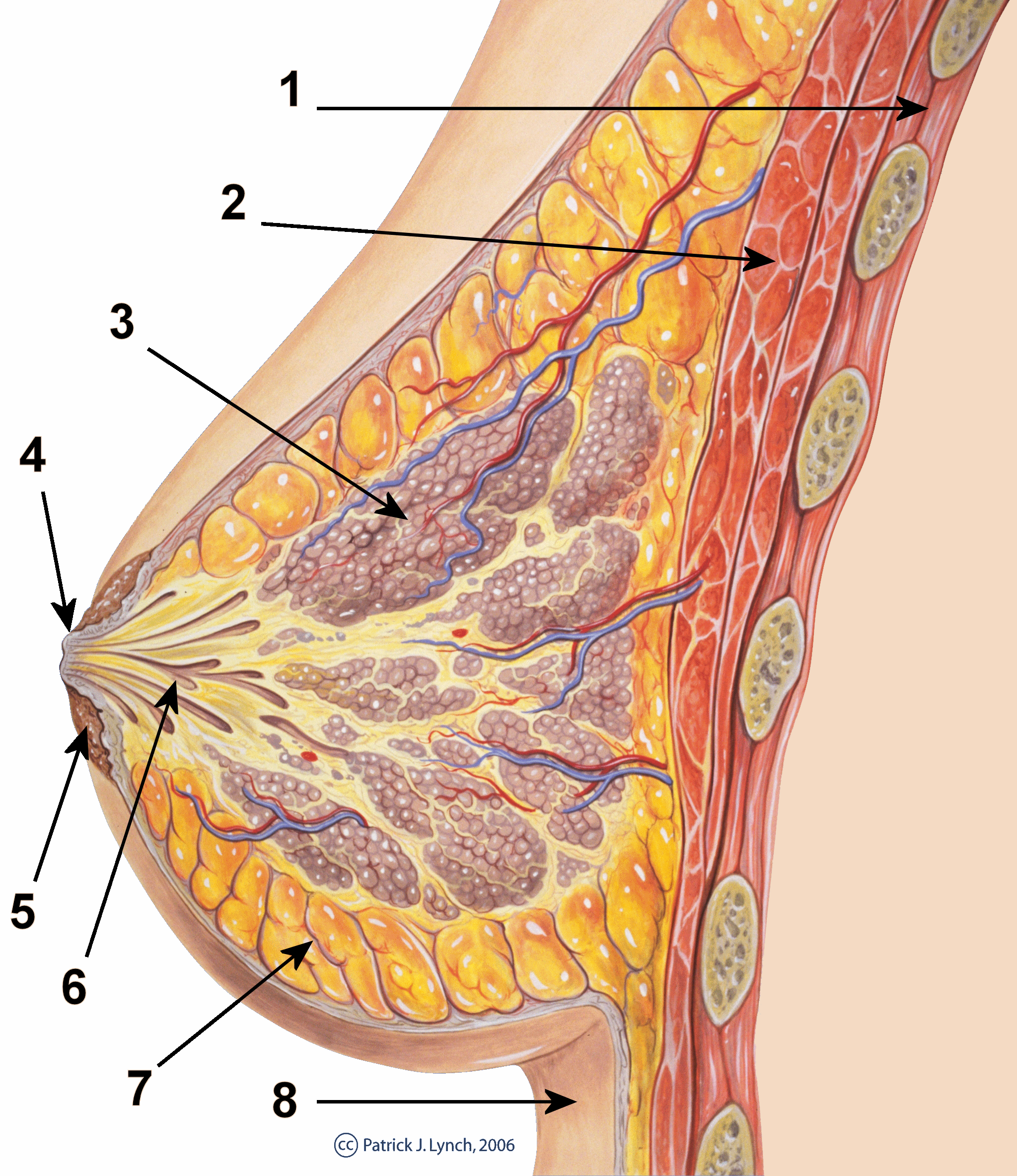
- The Breast: cross-section scheme of the mammary gland.: 1. Chest wall 2. Pectoralis muscles, 3. Lobules; 4. Nipple; 5. Areola and Montgomery glands 6. Milk duct 7. Fatty tissue 8. Skin

Details

Identifiers
- Latin: ductus lactiferi, tubulus lactiferi
- TA98: A16.0.02.010
- TA2: 7103
- FMA: 58006

Lactiferous ducts are ducts that converge and form a branched system connecting the nipple to the lobules of the mammary gland. When lactogenesis occurs, under the influence of hormones, the milk is moved to the nipple by the action of smooth muscle contractions along the ductal system to the tip of the nipple. They are also referred to as galactophores, galactophorous ducts, mammary ducts, mamillary ducts or milk ducts.

== Structure ==
Lactiferous ducts are lined by a columnar epithelium supported by myoepithelial cells. Prior to 2005, it was thought within the areola the lactiferous duct would dilate to form the lactiferous sinus in which milk accumulates between breastfeeding sessions. However past studies have shown that the lactiferous sinus does not exist.

== Function ==
The columnar epithelium plays a key role in balancing milk production, milk stasis and reabsorption. The cells of the columnar epithelium form tight junctions which are regulated by hormones and local factors like pressure and casein content. Prolactin and/or placental lactogen are required for tight junction closure while progesterone is the main hormone preventing closure before birth.

== Clinical significance ==
The majority of breast diseases either originate from lactiferous ducts or are closely related. The high susceptibility to benign and malignant diseases is in part a consequence of the cycling hormonal growth stimulation resulting in a high cell turnover and accumulation of defects and complicated hormonal equilibrium which is highly sensitive to disturbance.

- phyllodes tumor and intraductal papilloma of the breast
- mastalgia is frequently caused by an imbalance of breast secretion in the lobules and resorption in the ducts
- nonpuerperal mastitis is frequently caused by a similar mechanism in combination with an infection
- duct ectasia is similar and overlapping with the above-mentioned
- subareolar abscess and squamous metaplasia of lactiferous ducts
- most forms of fibrocystic breast changes and cysts are thought to originate from lactiferous ducts
- most breast cancers arise from the ductal epithelium

=== Breast ductal carcinoma ===
Ductal carcinoma in situ (DCIS) is the proliferation of malignant ductal cells without penetrating the stromal tissue around them. In other words, DCIS is the presence of abnormal cells in a breast's milk duct. It is thought to be the earliest form of breast cancer and is noninvasive (it has not spread from the milk duct and has a low risk of becoming invasive). DCIS can be differentiated into groups based on low, intermediate, and high grade. When comparing the growth potential of normal epithelial cells to DCIS, it is 10 times larger, and the apoptosis rate was also 15 times greater. Furthermore, comedo-type DCIS usually causes necrosis in the duct center and has a more significant threat of reappearance.

The majority of ductal carcinomas are positive for luminal cell markers (CK8, CK18, CK19) but negative for basal cell markers (CK5/6 and CK14). In 30% of cases, DCIS is multifocal and usually is in the same breast. There is axillary lymph node invasion in 2-6% of DCIS cases. DCIS is frequently found during mammograms and makes up 25% of screen-detected breast cancers.

The degree of the disease in the breast determines DCIS treatment. In widespread or multifocal DCIS patients, a mastectomy is the recommended choice with the chance of reconstruction. Further clinical trials are being worked on to find an alternative to surgery.

There is not a clear cause for DCIS. This type of cancer comes from genetic mutations in the breast duct cells' DNA. The mutations make the cells look abnormal, but these cells are still not able to leave the breast duct. It is unknown what the exact cause is of this abnormal cell growth that causes DCIS. However, factors that potentially have a role are lifestyle, environment, and passed-down genes.

== See also ==
- Blocked milk duct
- Breastfeeding
- Lactation
- List of distinct cell types in the adult human body
