= Adenomyoepithelioma of the breast =

- Other names: Adenomyoepithelioma
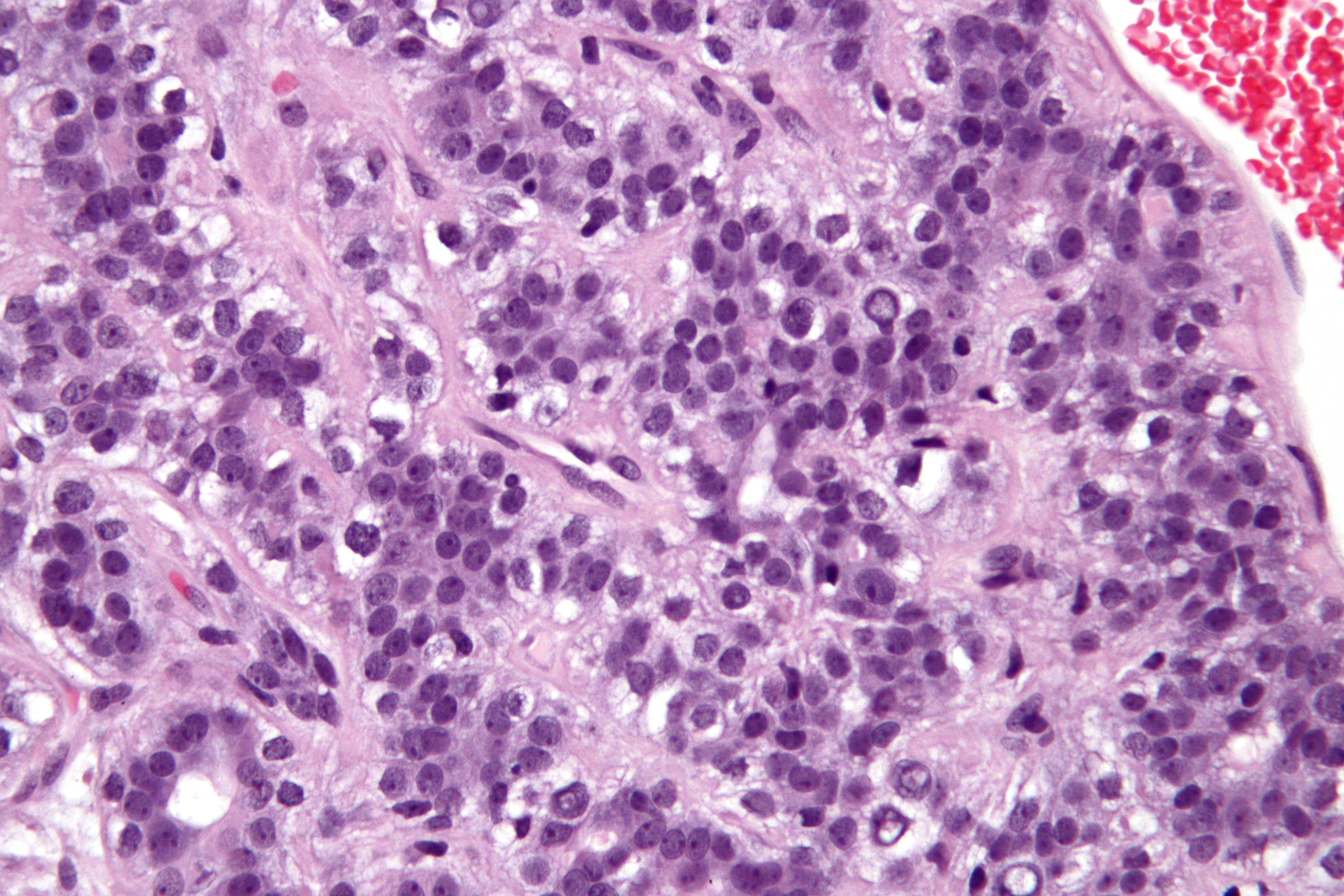
- Micrograph of an adenomyoepithelioma. H&E stain.
- Specialty: Pathology

An adenomyoepithelioma of the breast is a rare tumour in the breast composed of glandular elements (adeno-) and myoepithelial cells. It is usually benign; however, there are reports of malignant behaviour.

The histomorphologic appearance can resemble invasive ductal carcinoma, the most common type of invasive breast cancer.

== Additional images ==
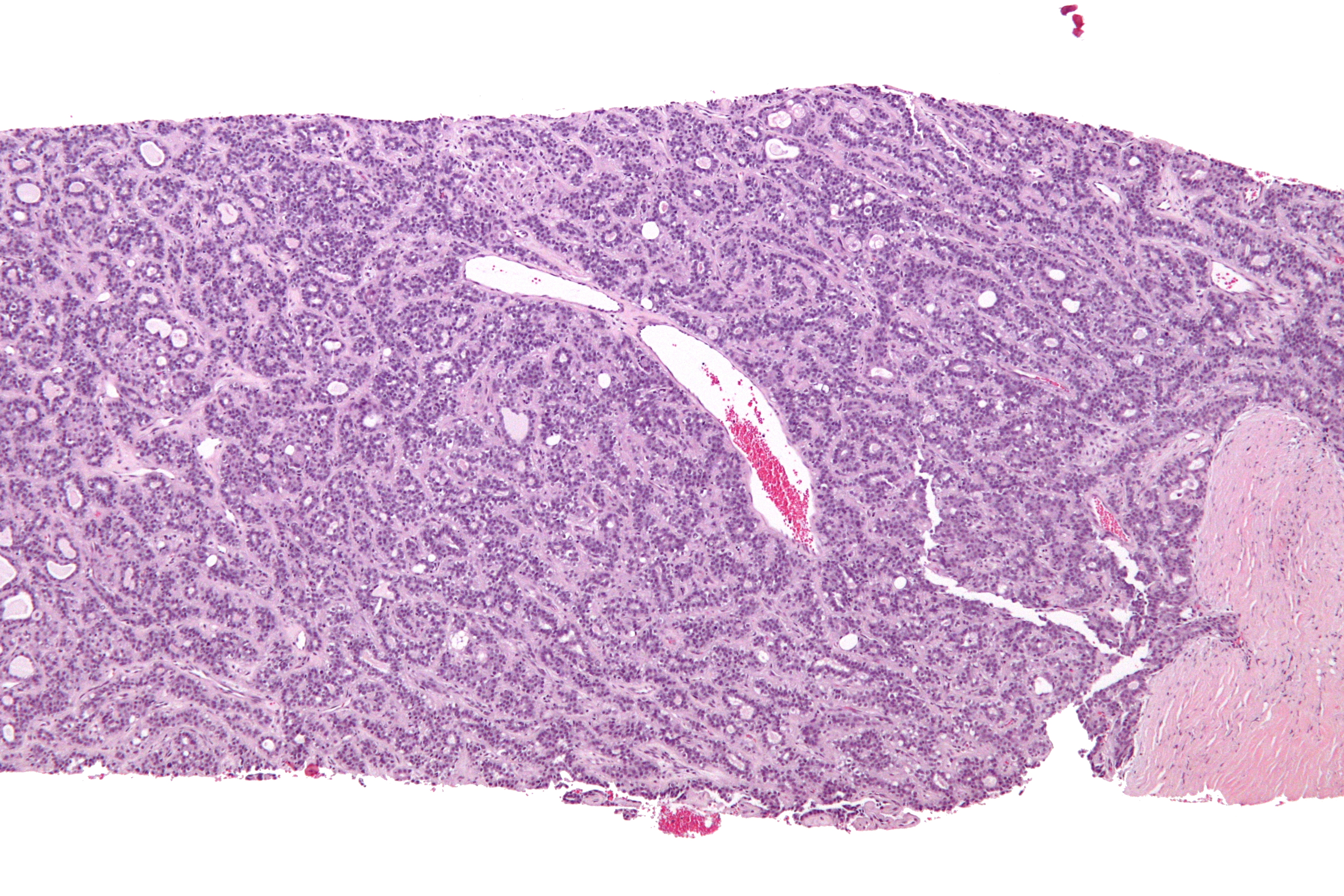
Low magnification

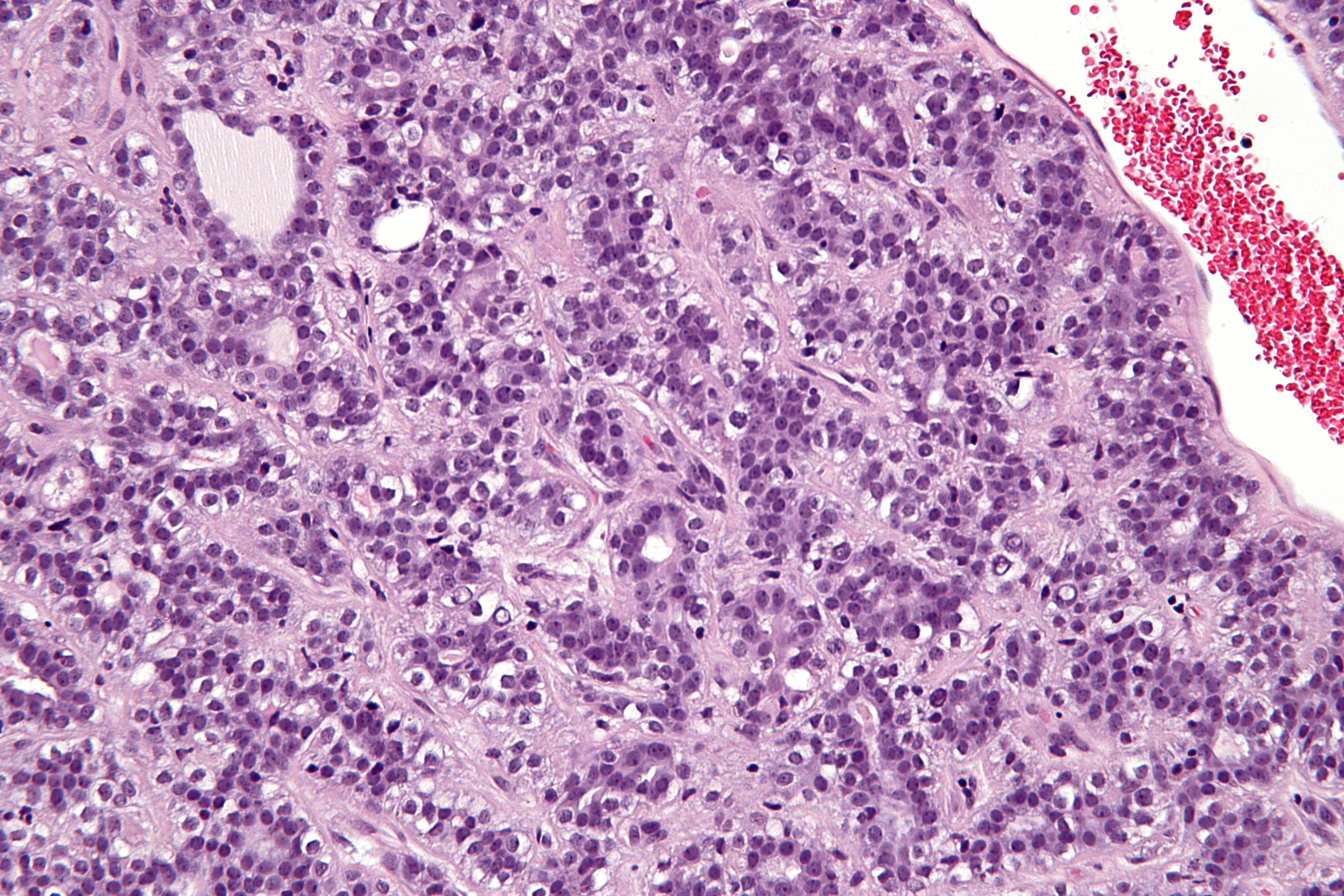
High magnification

== See also ==
- Epithelial-myoepithelial carcinoma
