= Epithelial-myoepithelial carcinoma =

Part of the exocrine gland ductal system in salivary glands

Epithelial-myoepithelial carcinoma is thought to be of intercalated duct origin. This is the first part of the exocrine gland ductal system in salivary glands, lined with cuboidal epithelium. Myoepithelial cells are thought to line the basal side of these ducts. The intercalated ducts are small ducts in the salivary gland that assist in connecting the secretory cells to larger striated ducts. They are thought to participate in the formation of primary saliva.

A recent study found that more or less eighty percent of EMC cases demonstrated evidence suggesting it arises from preexisting pleomorphic adenoma.

== Histology ==
EMC is a biphasic neoplasm of the salivary glands that exhibits well-defined tubules composed of two distinct cell types. The outer layer consists of myoepithelial cells with clear cytoplasm, encircling an inner layer of eosinophilic cuboidal epithelial cells, which resemble intercalated ducts. Its characteristic tubular growth pattern reflects this phenotype, supporting the presumed idea that the tumor originates from the intercalated ducts of the salivary glands.

It was common to see tumor cells with cribriform histology which shows holes or spaces, a basaloid appearance which is a dark, compact appearance, and some features that looked like oil-producing glands, known as sebaceous differentiation.

== Diagnosis and microscopy ==
A common diagnosis is confirmed through conventional light microscopy by ultrastructural investigation and immunohistochemistry. Although it can vary, the standard form of EMC under a microscope has a unique lobular growth pattern, often with Necrosis in the center. The tumor consists of these intercalated ducts lined by smaller epithelial cells, surrounded by a layer of more extensive, clear myoepithelial cells. Variations of EMC exist based on the proportion of epithelial to myoepithelial cells. Some types are dominated by clear cells, while others feature spindle-shaped myoepithelial cells or more aggressive appearing ductal cells. These differences can complicate diagnosis, as the tumor may resemble other salivary gland malignancies, such as mucoepidermoid carcinoma. Additionally, EMC shares significant similarities with adenoid cystic carcinoma, and the two have sometimes been classified together as a "hybrid" carcinoma. The clear myoepithelial cells contain glycogen but lack mucin, a key feature that differentiates EMC from other similar tumors. Another challenge with EMC is distinguishing it from the benign form, myoepithelioma, as it can be challenging to define malignancy without atypia. Malignant behavior is identified through factors such as cytological differences in the myoepithelial cells, higher cellularity, pleomorphism (microbiology), significant invasion, and destructive growth. Immunostaining and diagnostic tests are used to identify myoepithelial cells, which typically test positive for proteins like S-100 protein and smooth muscle actin, while the inner ductal cells do not react to keratin stains. Electron microscopy can be used to further confirm the distinction between these two cell types, revealing that the clear myoepithelial cells contain glycogen and muscle-like fibers. Although EMC is classified as a slow-growing cancer, it can still be aggressive and, in some cases, deadly. Similar tumors have also been identified in the breast and, less frequently, in the skin.

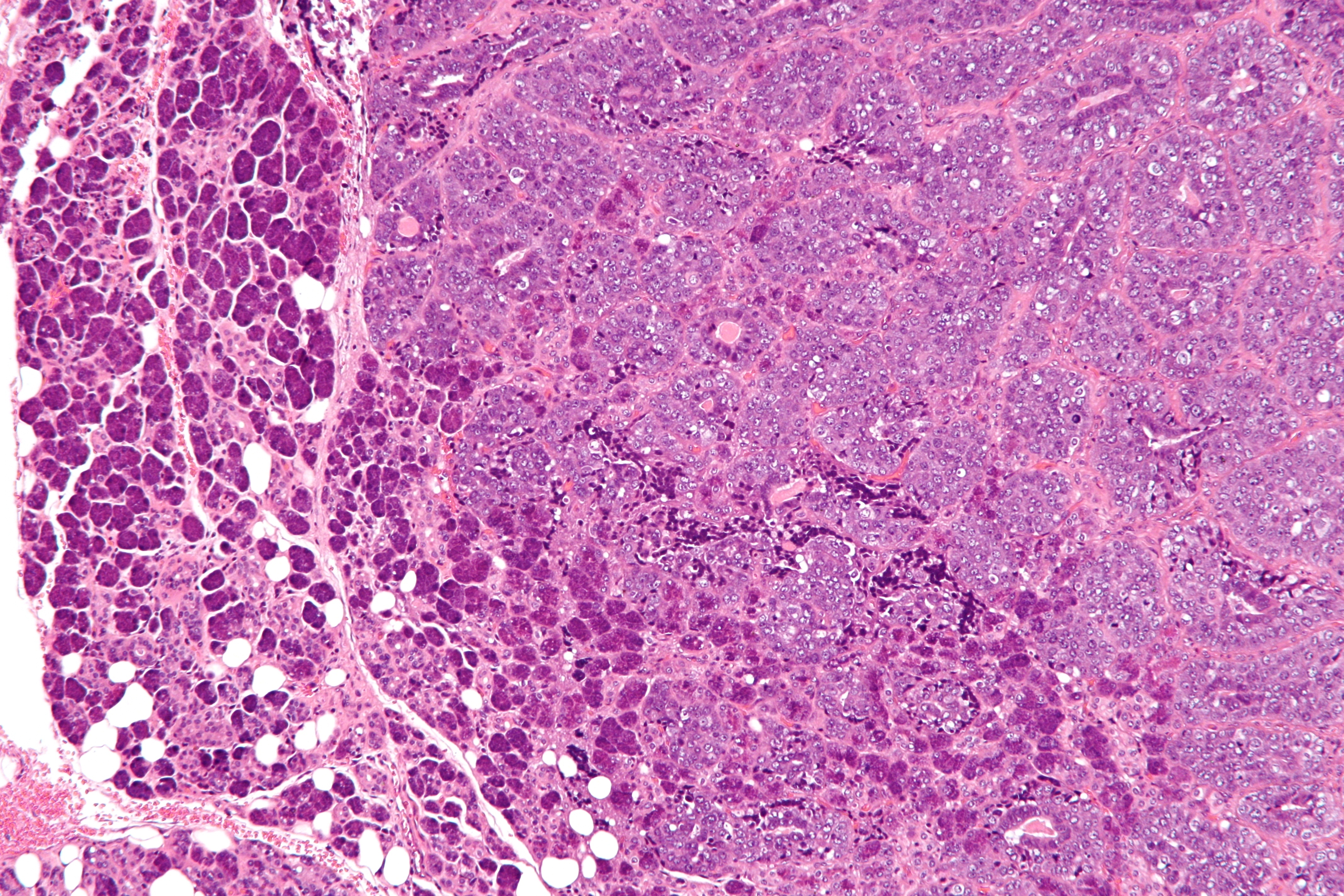
A microscopy image of epithelial-myoepithelial carcinoma

== EMC intracellular pathways ==
Many human malignant tumors are characterized by the active involvement of growth factors and receptors from the epidermal growth factor receptor family. Two main signals that operate downstream —RAS-RAF-MEK-MAPK and PI3K-Akt—drive tumor growth, invasion, movement, and new blood vessel formation. Ras proteins are protooncogenes that are commonly mutated in various human cancers. Specific Ras protein isoforms are linked to particular types of cancer. RAS proteins are small GTPases that regulate numerous essential cellular processes, such as growth and survival. Gain-of-function missense mutations which primarily occurs at codons 12, 13, and 61, maintain RAS in an active state.

These RAS proteins act as classic GTPase switches, turning on downstream signaling pathways involved in cell survival when bound to GTP and interacting with effector proteins. Their return to the inactive GDP-bound form is promoted by GTPase-activating proteins, which enhance RAS’s naturally weak GTP-hydrolyzing ability. Mutations at codons 12, 13, or the catalytic residue Q61 impair RAS inactivation by interfering with GAP-mediated GTP hydrolysis, resulting in persistent, oncogenic signaling.

HRAS (Harvey rat sarcoma viral oncogene homolog) mutations have been identified in salivary gland tumors, especially in epithelial-myoepithelial carcinoma. HRAS gene is a proto-oncogene that provides instructions for producing the H-Ras protein. However, because EMC is rare, the prevalence and distinct role of HRAS mutations, as well as their connection to different histologic forms, are not fully explored.

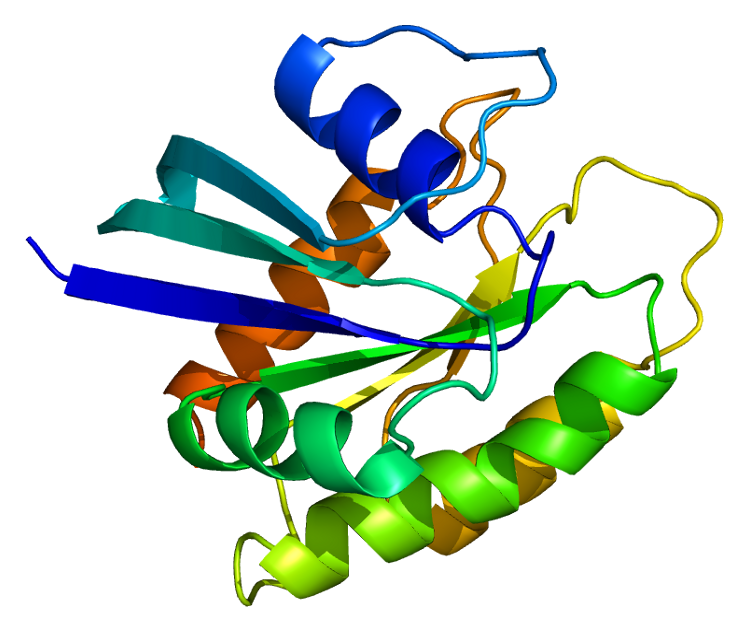
HRAS gene structure: a member of the RAS family of protooncogenes

A recent study found that HRAS hotspot point mutations, especially the Q16iR mutation, are associated explicitly with EMC, and analyzing these genes helps ensure an accurate diagnosis. A similar study found that the HRAS mutation were detected in 82.7% of EMC cases, and also found it was primarily at codon 61, or Q61R. This mutation is a replacement of the amino acid glutamine (Q) at position 61 with arginine (R) which is a driver for the mutation in the HRAS gene. As mentioned prior, studies have found that evidence suggests EMC arises from preexisting pleomorphic adenoma. However, HRAS mutations were absent in EMC arising from pleomorphic adenomas. Similarly, HRAS mutations were not found in other salivary gland tumors with EMC-like characteristics, such as adenoid cystic carcinoma and pleomorphic adenoma. These findings suggest that HRAS mutations are a common genetic change driving EMC and may help improve diagnostic accuracy and distinguish EMC from similar tumors. Because HRAS mutations are fairly frequent in these more common tumors—especially pleomorphic adenoma—studying HRAS mutations in rarer tumors, such as EMC, might help researchers understand how those develop at the molecular level.

== See also ==
- Salivary gland cancer
- Myoepithelial cell
- Myoepithelioma
- Pleomorphic adenoma
- Mucoepidermoid carcinoma
- Adenoid cystic carcinoma
- Intercalated duct
- HRAS
- Immunohistochemistry
- Salivary gland
