= Polymorphous low-grade adenocarcinoma =

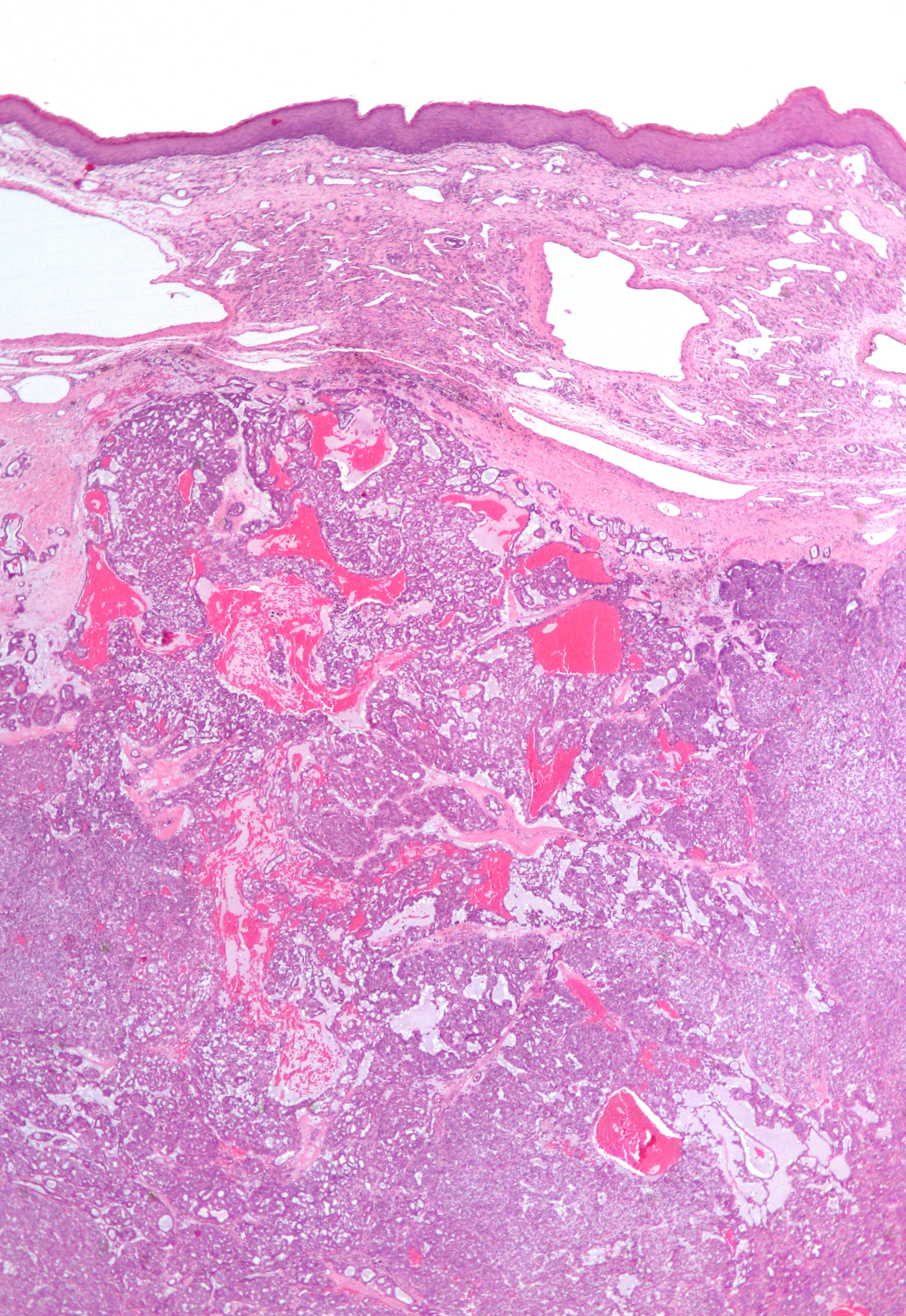
- Low magnification micrograph of a polymorphous low-grade adenocarcinoma, showing the typical variation of architectural arrangement. H&E stain.
- Specialty: ENT surgery

Polymorphous low-grade adenocarcinoma (PLGA) is a rare, asymptomatic, slow-growing malignant salivary gland tumor. It is most commonly found in the palate.

The name of the tumor derives from the fact that:

- It has a varied microscopic architectural appearance, i.e. it is polymorphous.
- It is non-aggressive when compared to other oral cavity tumors, i.e. it is a low-grade tumor.
- It forms glands, i.e. it is an adenocarcinoma.

It affects the minor salivary glands in the area between the hard and the soft palate. Male to female ratio is 3:1, and the average age is 56 years.

== Histology ==
PLGAs consist of a monomorphous cell population that has a varied histologic morphology.

Microscopically, its histology can be confused with an adenoid cystic carcinoma and a pleomorphic adenoma.

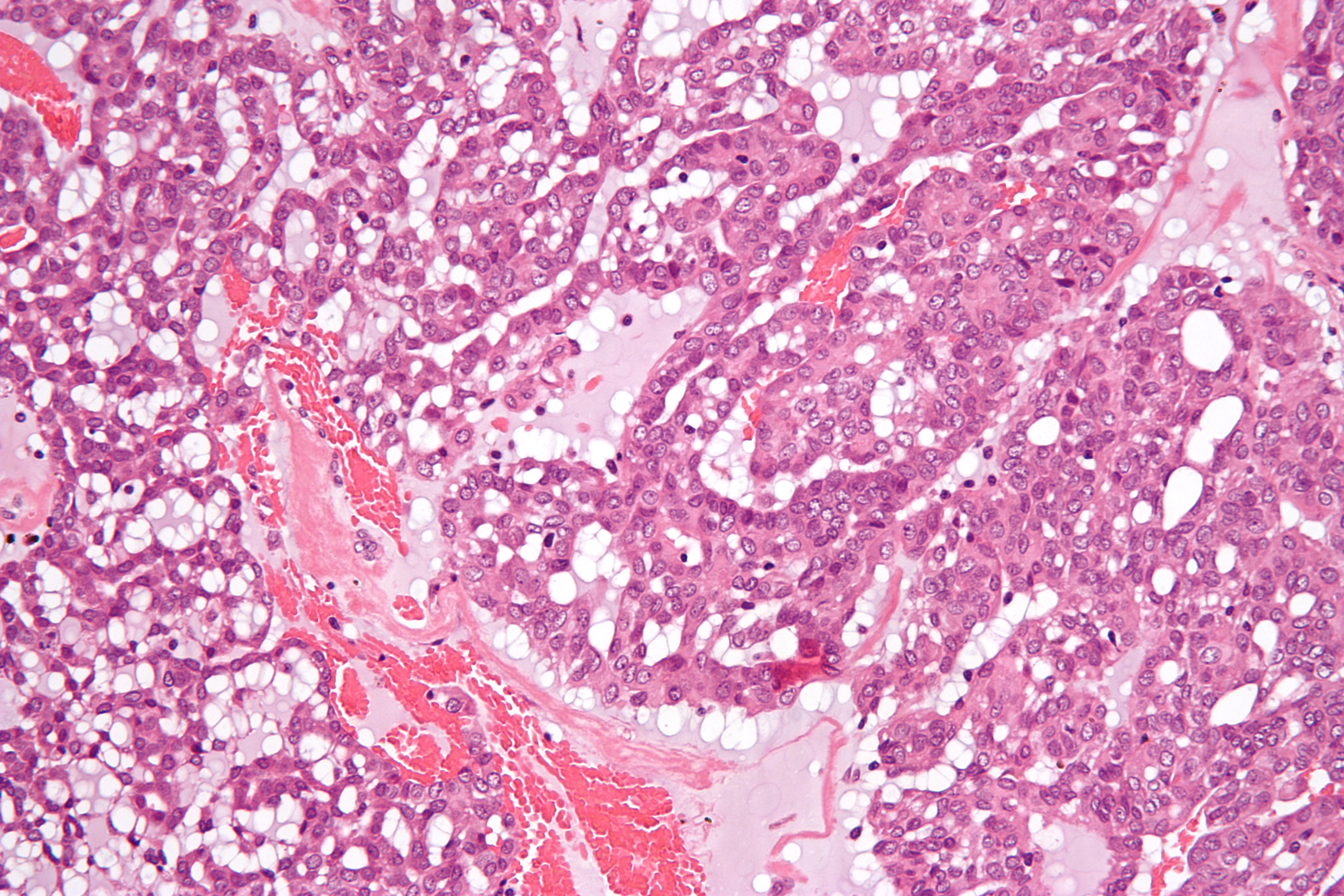
Polymorphous low-grade adenocarcinoma. H&E stain.

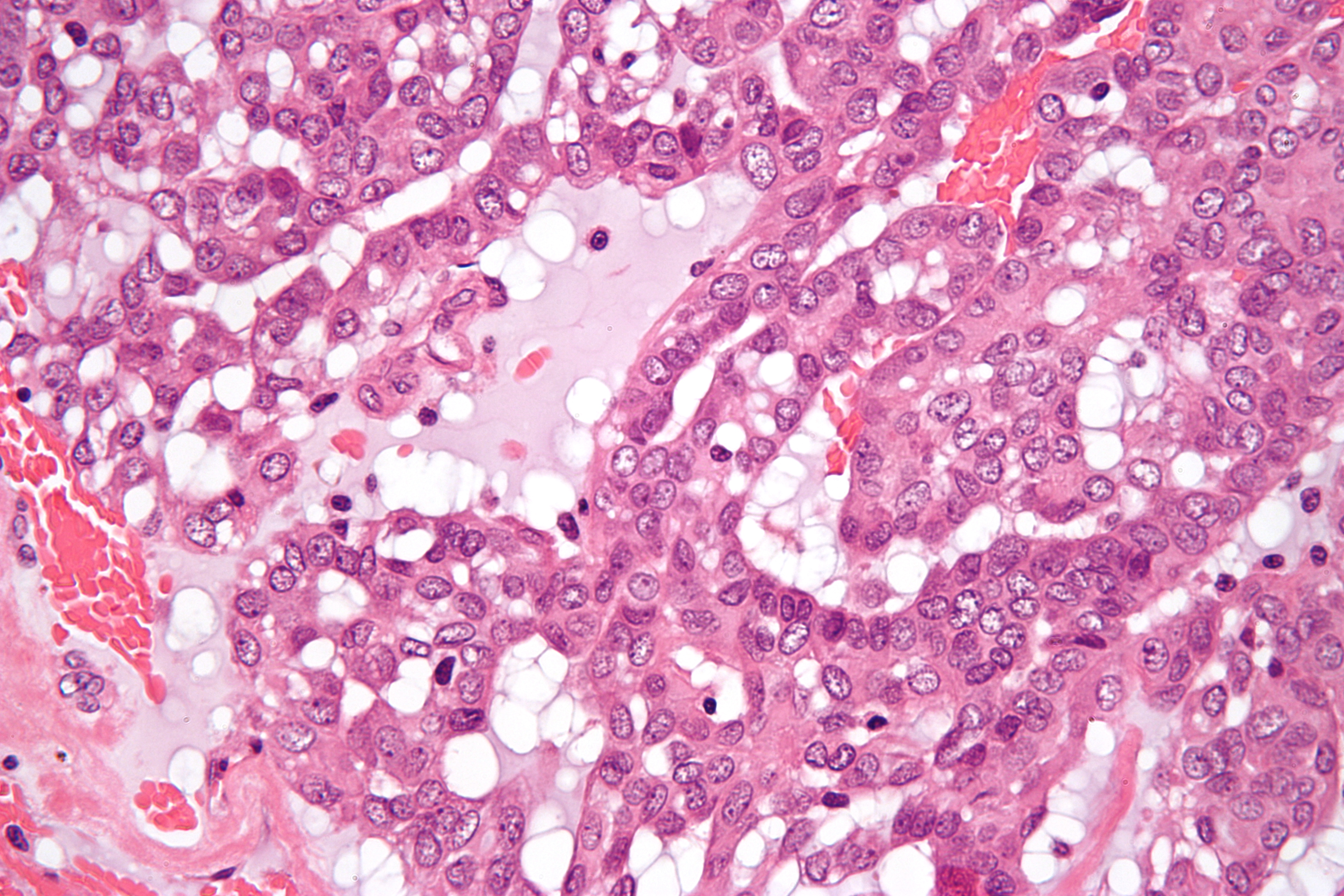
Micrograph of a polymorphous low-grade adenocarcinoma. H&E stain.

== Treatment ==
PLGAs are treated with wide local surgical excision and long-term follow-up. There is a recurrence rate of 14% (Peterson, contemporary of oral and maxillofacial surgery).
