= Atypical ductal hyperplasia =

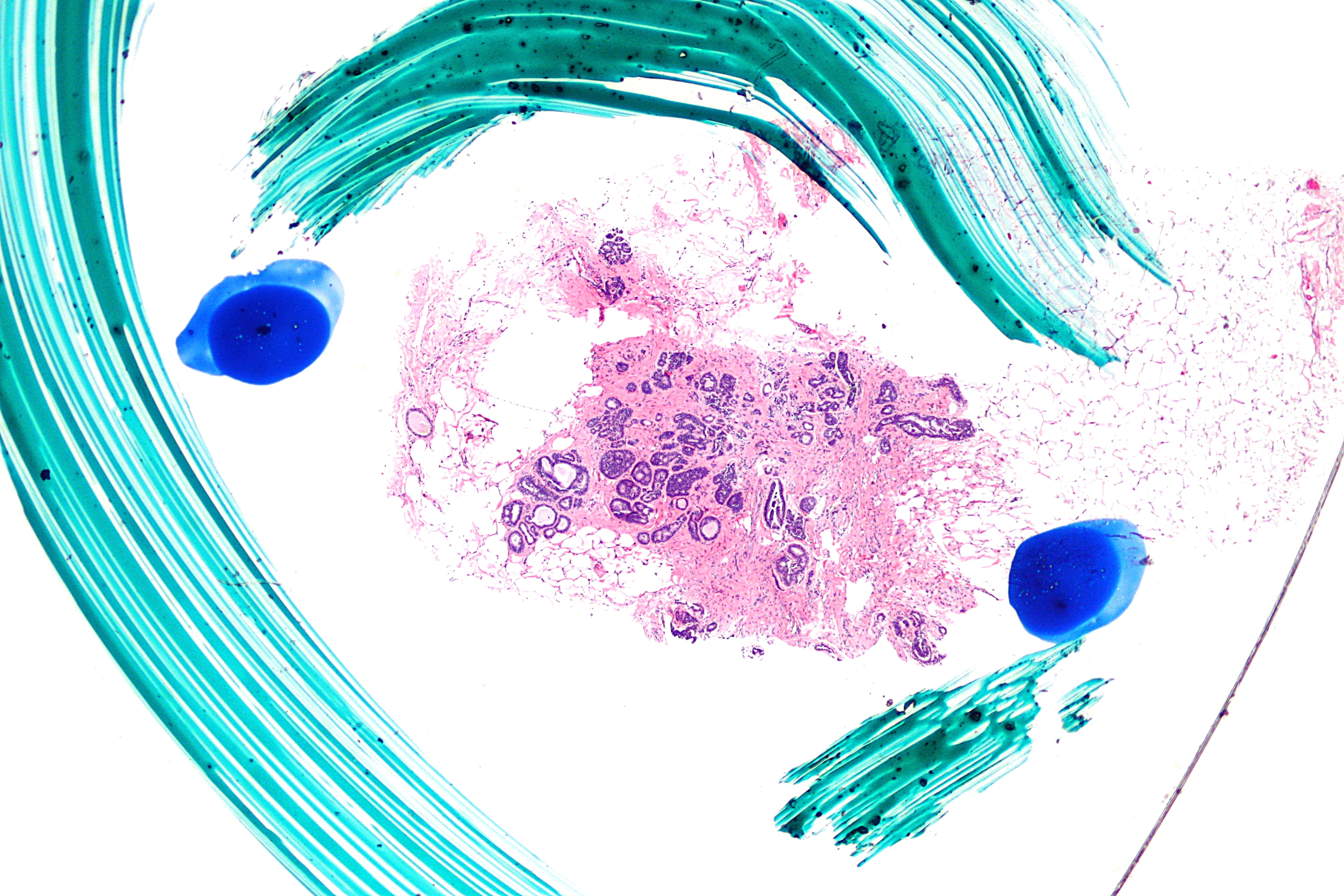
- Very low magnification micrograph of atypical ductal hyperplasia (ADH). The piece with ADH was circled by the pathologist with a marker, as it is so small, and sent for an additional opinion. H&E stain.
- Specialty: Gynecology, pathology

Atypical ductal hyperplasia (ADH) is the term used for a benign lesion of the breast that indicates an increased risk of breast cancer.

The name of the entity is descriptive of the lesion; ADH is characterized by cellular proliferation (hyperplasia) within one or two breast ducts and (histomorphologic) architectural abnormalities, i.e. the cells are arranged in an abnormal or atypical way, more so than usual ductal hyperplasia.

In the context of a core (needle) biopsy, ADH is considered an indication for a breast lumpectomy, also known as a surgical (excisional) biopsy, to exclude the presence of breast cancer.

== Signs and symptoms ==
ADH, generally, is asymptomatic. It usually comes to medical attention on a screening mammogram, as a non-specific suspicious abnormality that requires a biopsy.

== Pathology ==
ADH, cytologically, architecturally and on a molecular basis, is identical to a low-grade ductal carcinoma in situ (DCIS); however, it has a limited extent, i.e. is present in a very small amount (< 2 mm).

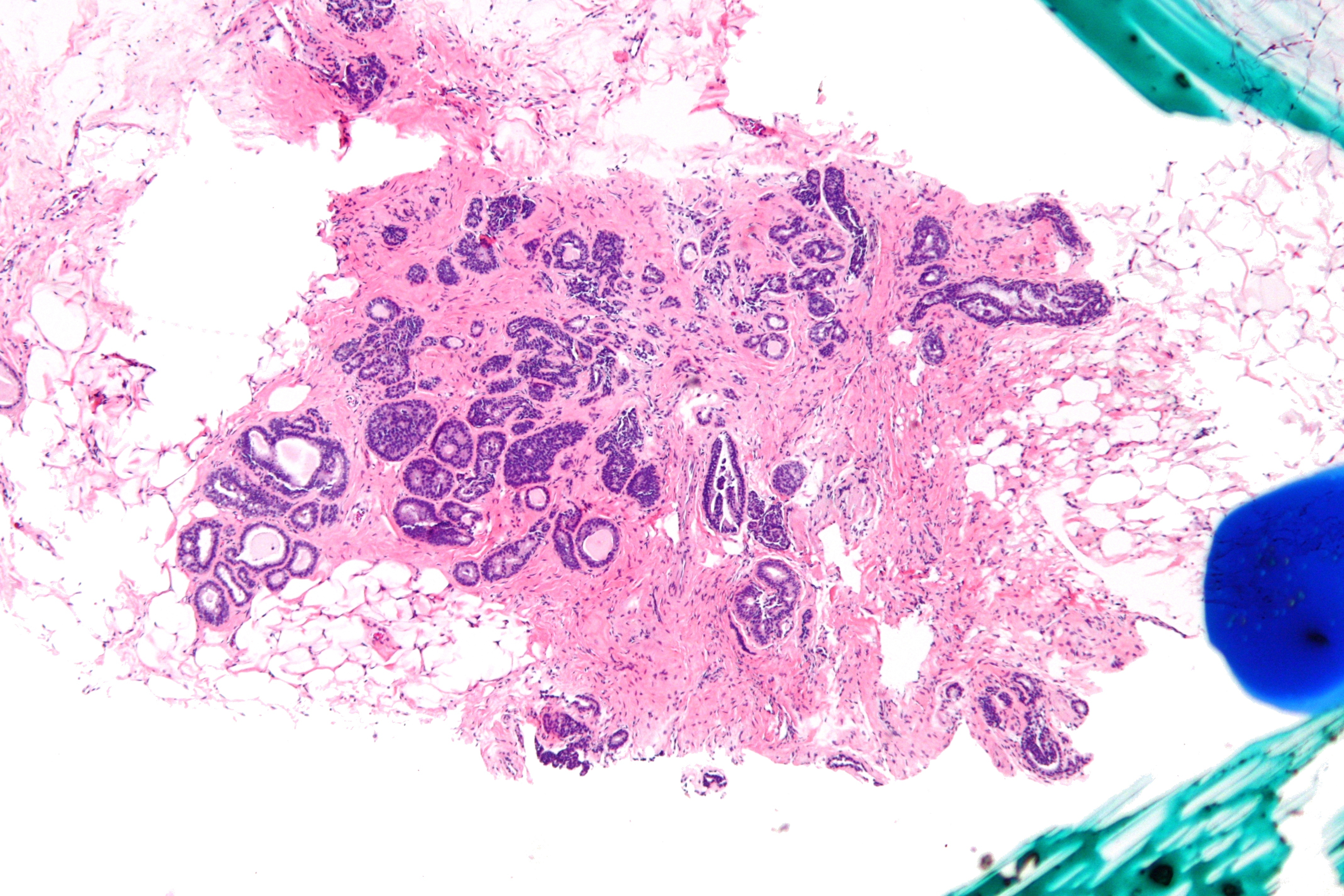
Low mag.

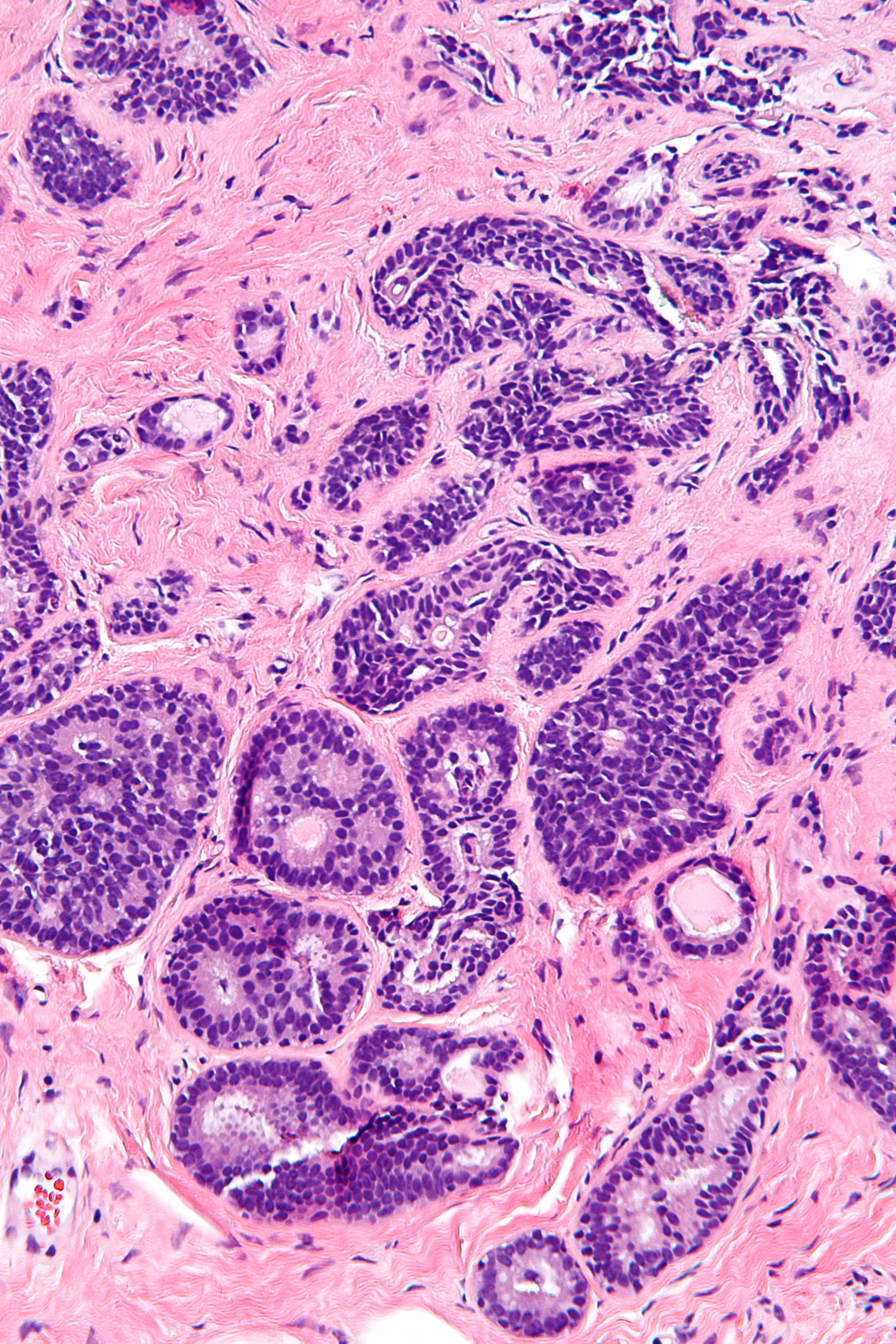
High mag.

=== Relation to low-grade ductal carcinoma in situ ===
While the histopathologic features and molecular features of ADH are that of (low-grade) DCIS, its clinical behaviour, unlike low-grade DCIS, is substantially better; thus, the more aggressive treatment for DCIS is not justified.

== Diagnosis ==
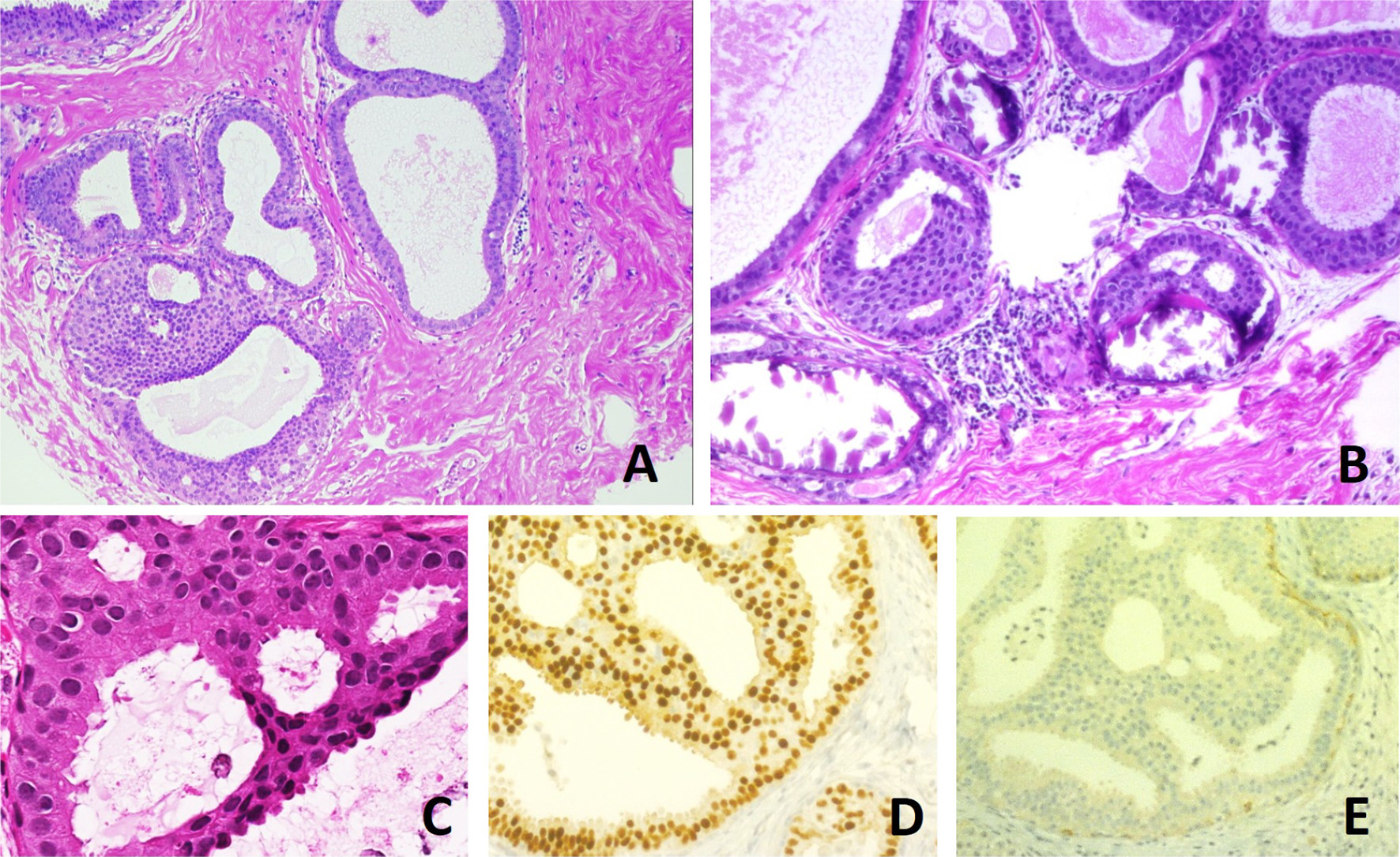
Histological appearance of atypical ductal hyperplasia (ADH) and immunohistochemical phenotype: A - One focus (< 2 mm) of two architecturally disarranged cross sections of tubuli showing a monotonous intraductal proliferation with secondary intraluminal architecture. Hematoxylin and Eosin stain.; B - One area of an ADH with associated calcifications intraluminal. Hematoxylin and Eosin stain.; C - Higher magnification of ADH shows low-grade nuclear atypia and monotonous cell proliferation along with secondary intraluminal architecture. Hematoxylin and Eosin stain.; D - Strong and uniform expression of estrogen receptors (ER). ER immunohistochemistry.; E - Lack of basal cytokeratins (CK5/6). CK5/6 immunohistochemistry.

It is diagnosed based on tissue, e.g. a biopsy, showing ductal hyperplasia.

There is no single definite cutoff that separates atypical ductal hyperplasia from ductal carcinoma in situ, but the following are important distinctive features of atypical ductal hyperplasia, with suggested cutoffs:

- Size less than 2 mm.
- Not involving more than one duct.
- The atypical epithelial proliferation is admixed with a second population of proliferative cells without atypia.
- The proliferation completely involves the terminal ductal lobular unit(s), to a limited extent.

== Treatment ==
ADH, if found on a surgical (excisional) biopsy of a mammographic abnormality, does not require any further treatment, only mammographic follow-up.

If ADH is found on a core (needle) biopsy (a procedure which generally does not excise a suspicious mammographic abnormality), a surgical biopsy, i.e. a breast lumpectomy, to completely excise the abnormality and exclude breast cancer is the typical recommendation.

Besides surgical treatment, Selective Estrogen-Receptor Modulators (SERMs) like Tamoxifen is highly effective for women diagnosed with ADH, reducing subsequent breast cancer risk by up to 86% based on the NSABP P-1 trial (National Surgical Adjuvant Breast and Bowel Project). Tamoxifen therapy requires individualized counseling regarding risks such as deep vein thrombosis (DVT), pulmonary embolism (PE), stroke and endometrial cancer, particularly in women over 50 years of age.

== Prognosis ==
=== Cancer risk for ADH on a core biopsy ===
The rate at which breast cancer (ductal carcinoma in situ or invasive mammary carcinoma (all breast cancer except DCIS and LCIS)) is found at the time of a surgical (excisional) biopsy, following the diagnosis of ADH on a core (needle) biopsy varies considerably from hospital-to-hospital (range 4-54%). In two large studies, the conversion of an ADH on core biopsy to breast cancer on surgical excision, known as "up-grading", is approximately 30%.

=== Cancer risk based on follow-up ===
The relative risk of breast cancer based on a median follow-up of 8 years, in a case control study of US registered nurses, is 3.7.

== See also ==
- Ductal carcinoma in situ
- Breast cancer
- Collagenous spherulosis
