= Median follow-up =

In statistics, median follow-up is the median time between a specified event and the time when data on outcomes are gathered. The concept is used in cancer survival analyses.

Many cancer studies aim to assess the time between two events of interest, such as from treatment to remission, treatment to relapse, or diagnosis to death. This duration is generically called survival time, even if the end point is not death.

Time-to-event studies must have sufficiently long follow-up durations to capture enough events to reveal meaningful patterns in the data. A short follow-up duration is appropriate for studying very severe cancers with poor prognoses, whereas a long follow-up duration is better suited to studying less-severe disease, or participants with good prognoses.

Median follow-up time is included in about half the survival analyses published in cancer journals, but of those, only 31% specify the method used to compute it.
