= Mucoepidermoid carcinoma =

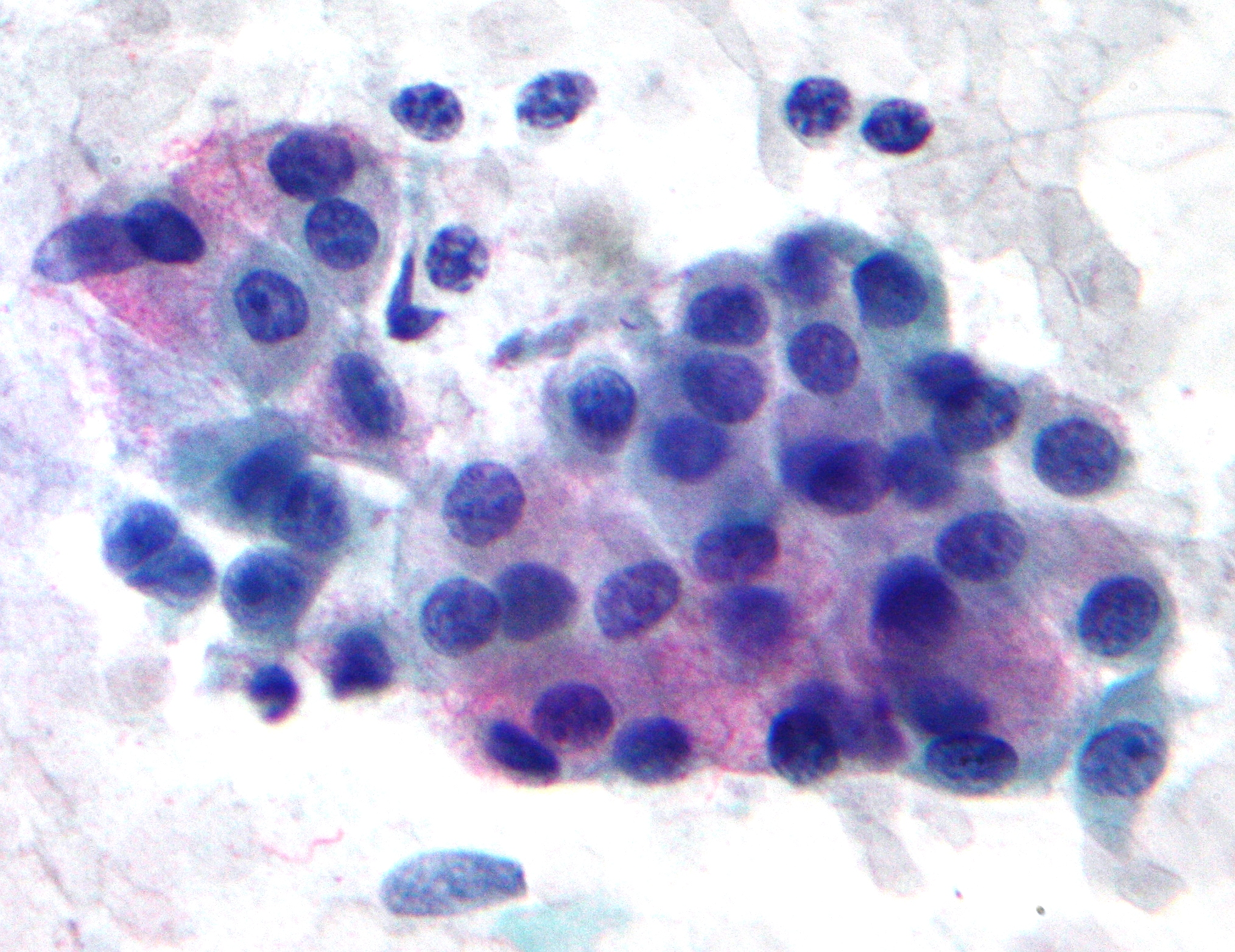
- Micrograph of a mucoepidermoid carcinoma. FNA specimen. Pap stain.
- Specialty: Oncology, Maxillofacial surgery, ENT surgery

Mucoepidermoid carcinoma (MEC) is the most common type of minor salivary gland malignancy in adults. Mucoepidermoid carcinoma can also be found in other organs, such as bronchi, lacrimal sac, and thyroid gland.

Mucicarmine staining is one stain used by pathologist for detection.

== Signs and symptoms ==
Presents as painless, slow-growing mass that is firm or hard. Most appear clinically as mixed tumors. Usually occurs at 30–50 years of age. More predilection towards female sex.

== Diagnosis ==
=== Histology ===
This tumor is not encapsulated and is characterized by squamous cells, mucus-secreting cells, and intermediate cells.

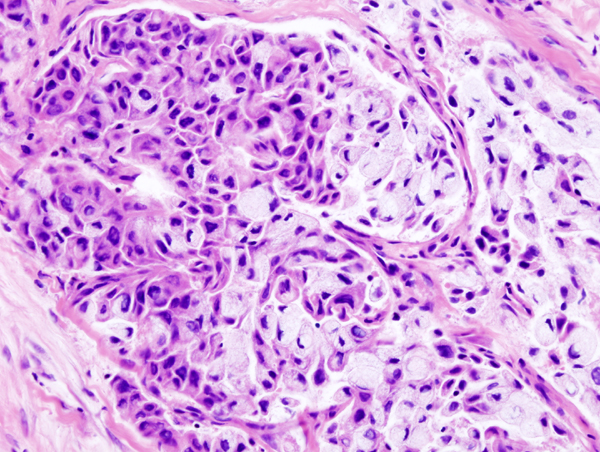
Histopathologic image of mucoepidermoid carcinoma of the major salivary gland. H & E stain

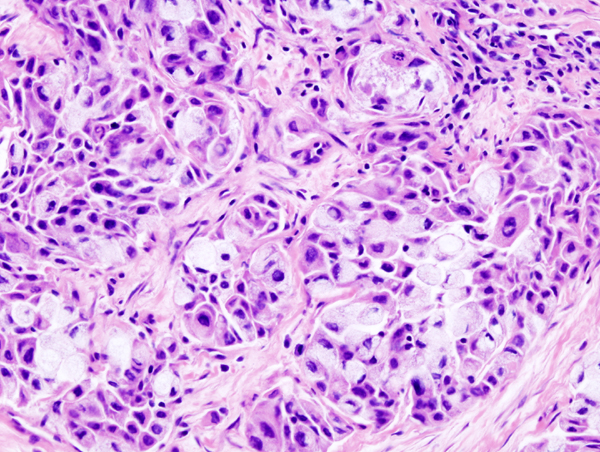
Histopathologic image of mucoepidermoid carcinoma of the major salivary gland. The same lesion as shown in a filename "Mucoepidermoid carcinoma (2) HE stain.jpg". H & E stain

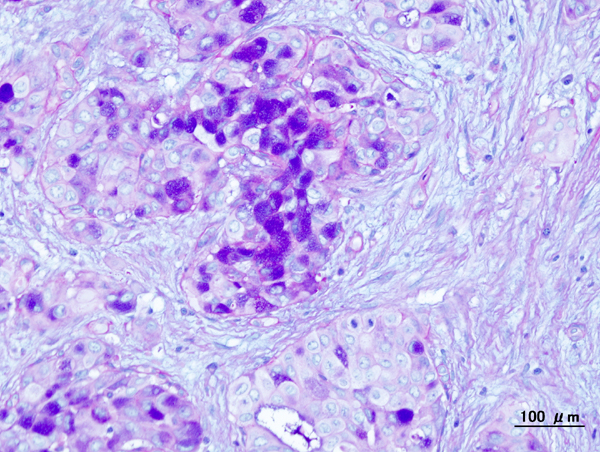
Histopathologic image of mucoepidermoid carcinoma. Postoperative recurrence of the submandibular tumor. Alcian blue-PAS stain

=== Molecular biology ===
Mucoepidermoid carcinomas of the salivary and bronchial glands are characterized by a recurrent t(11;19)(q21;p13) chromosomal translocation resulting in a MECT1-MAML2 fusion gene. The CREB-binding domain of the CREB coactivator MECT1 (also known as CRTC1, TORC1 or WAMTP1) is fused to the transactivation domain of the Notch coactivator MAML2.

A possible association with radiation exposure has been reported. It has also been proposed that mucoepidermoid tumors arise from subepithelial mucous glands of the upper respiratory or digestive tracts.

== Prognosis ==
Generally, there is a good prognosis for low-grade tumors, and a poor prognosis for high-grade tumors, however recent research have found reoccurring low grade tumors also have a poor prognosis.

== Treatment ==
Surgery is the recommended treatment for localised resectable disease. When the tumour is incompletely resected (positive margins) post-operative radiotherapy gives local control comparable to a complete resection (clear margins).

Sometimes when surgery is not possible due to extent of disease or if a patient is too frail for surgery, or declines surgery, palliative radiotherapy may be helpful. There has been a report of a case where low dose radiotherapy achieve disease response and control for more than 4 years.

In patients with metastatic disease, chemotherapy response tends to be low (27% partial response rate) and short lived.

== Epidemiology ==
Occurs in adults, with peak incidence from 20–40 years of age. A causal link with cytomegalovirus (CMV) has been strongly implicated in a 2011 research.

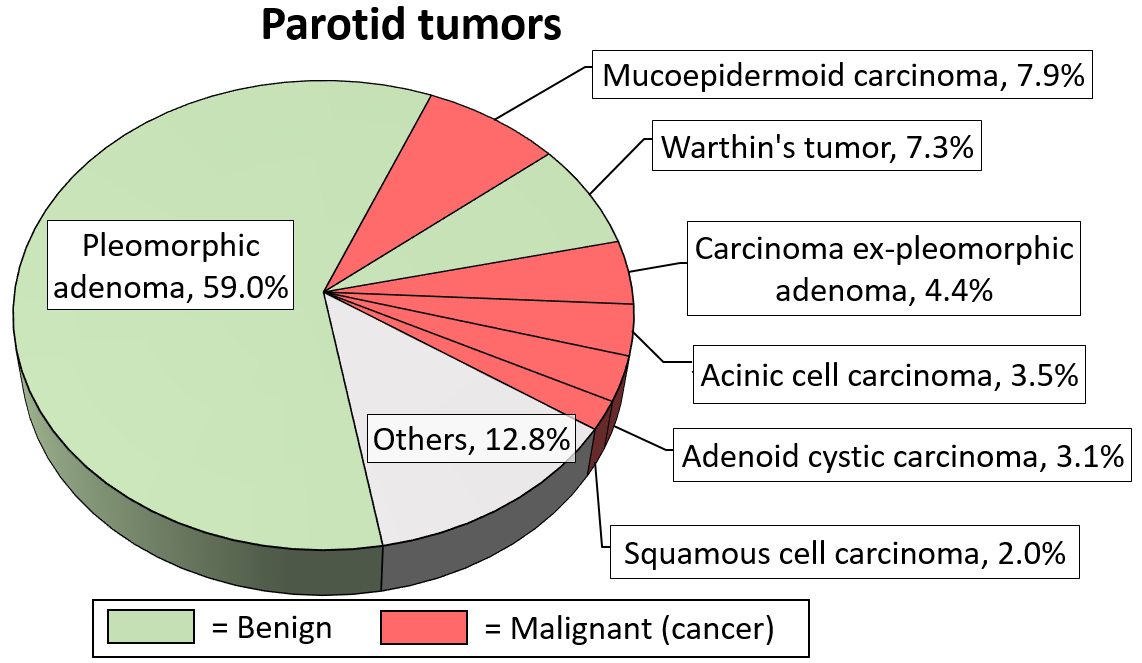
Relative incidence of parotid tumors, showing mucoepidermoid carcinoma at top right.

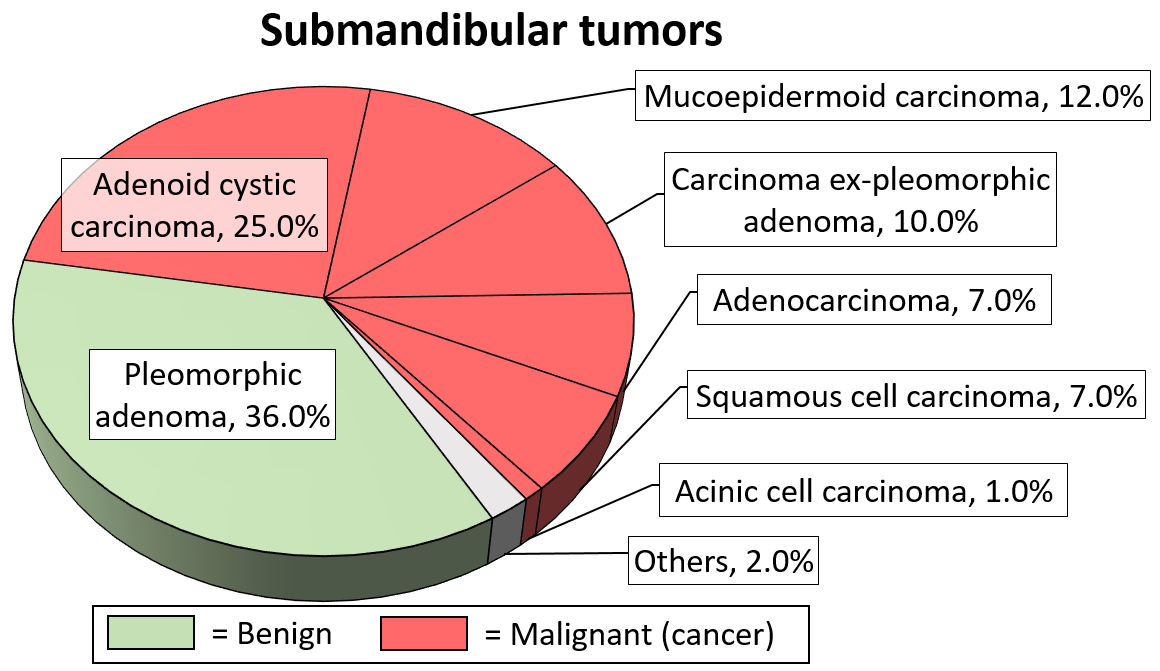
Relative incidence of submandibular tumors, showing mucoepidermoid carcinoma at top right.
