= Canalicular adenoma =

Benign salivary gland tumor

Canalicular adenoma is a type of growth that occurs in human salivary glands. It is a benign growth which occurs in the epithelial cells, and is typically arranged in columns of cells that form interconnecting cords. Canalicular adenoma is a very rare benign neoplasm; it constitutes about 1% of all salivary gland tumors and about 4% of all benign salivary gland tumors.

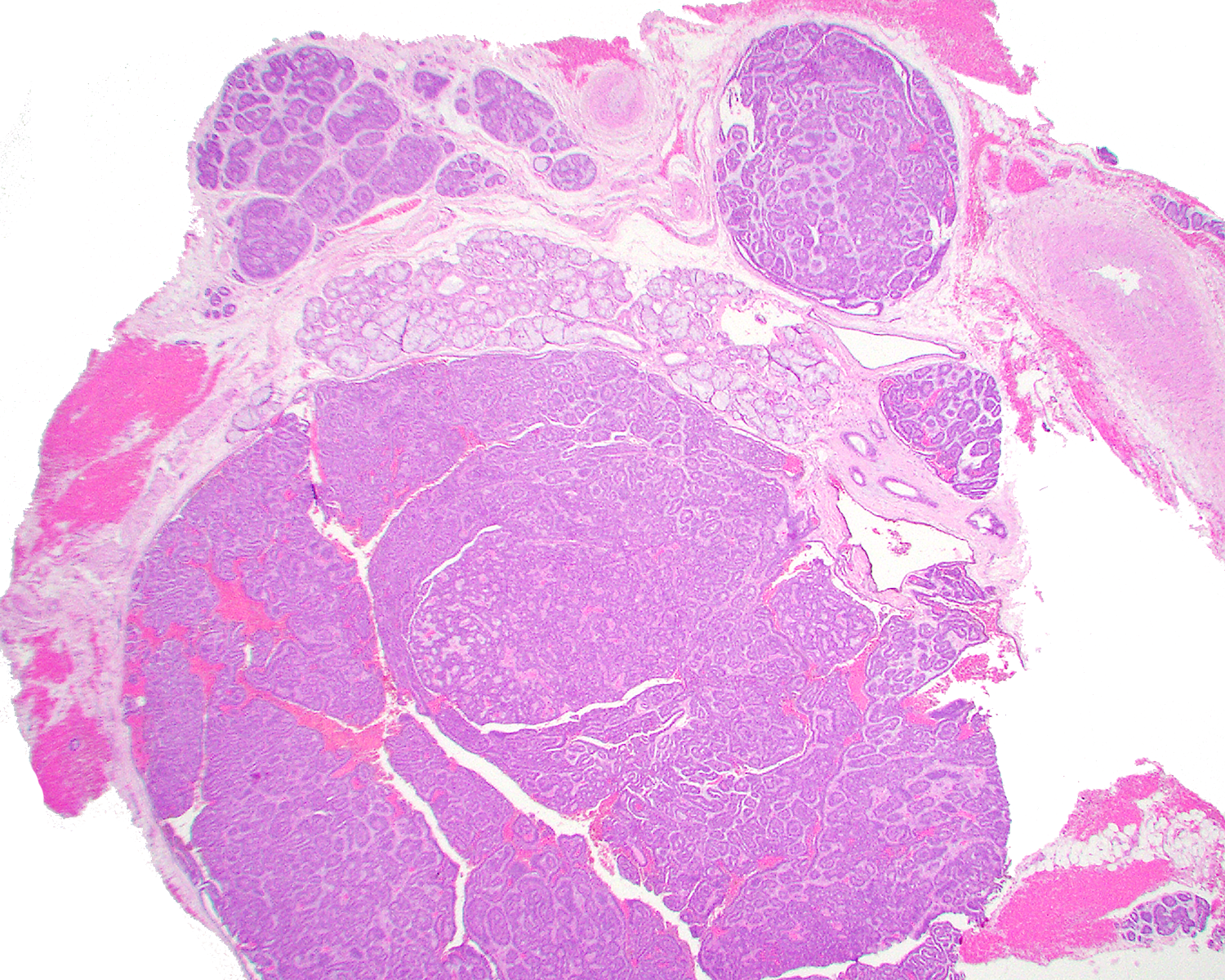
A hematoxylin and eosin stained slide of canalicular adenoma showing multifocality

== Presentation ==
Canalicular adenoma is most common in patients age 70 to 80, with females affected about four times as often as males. Most growths present in the upper lip; some also occur in the a few present in palate or buccal (cheek) tissue as a slowly enlarging mass. The growths will often arise in multiple places at the same time or develop multiple nodes, despite not being clinically invasive or malignant.

== Diagnosis ==
Canalicular adenoma growths are usually small at the time they are noticed, with an average size of about 1.6 cm. Their histologic appearance is very distinct, with a channel-like pattern between cords and ribbons; the pattern has been described as resembling a "string of pearls."

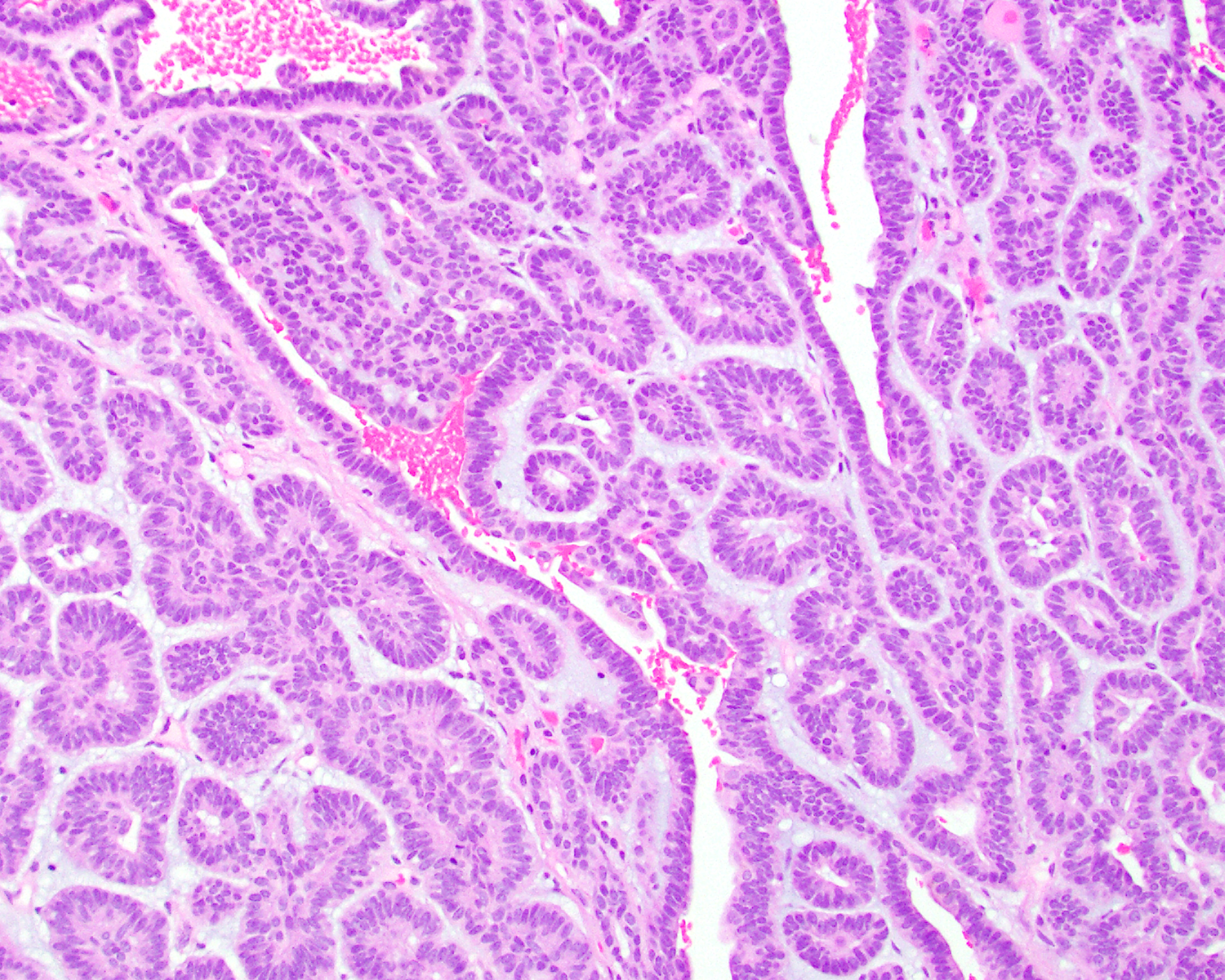
A hematoxylin and eosin stained slide of canalicular adenoma showing large canaliculi

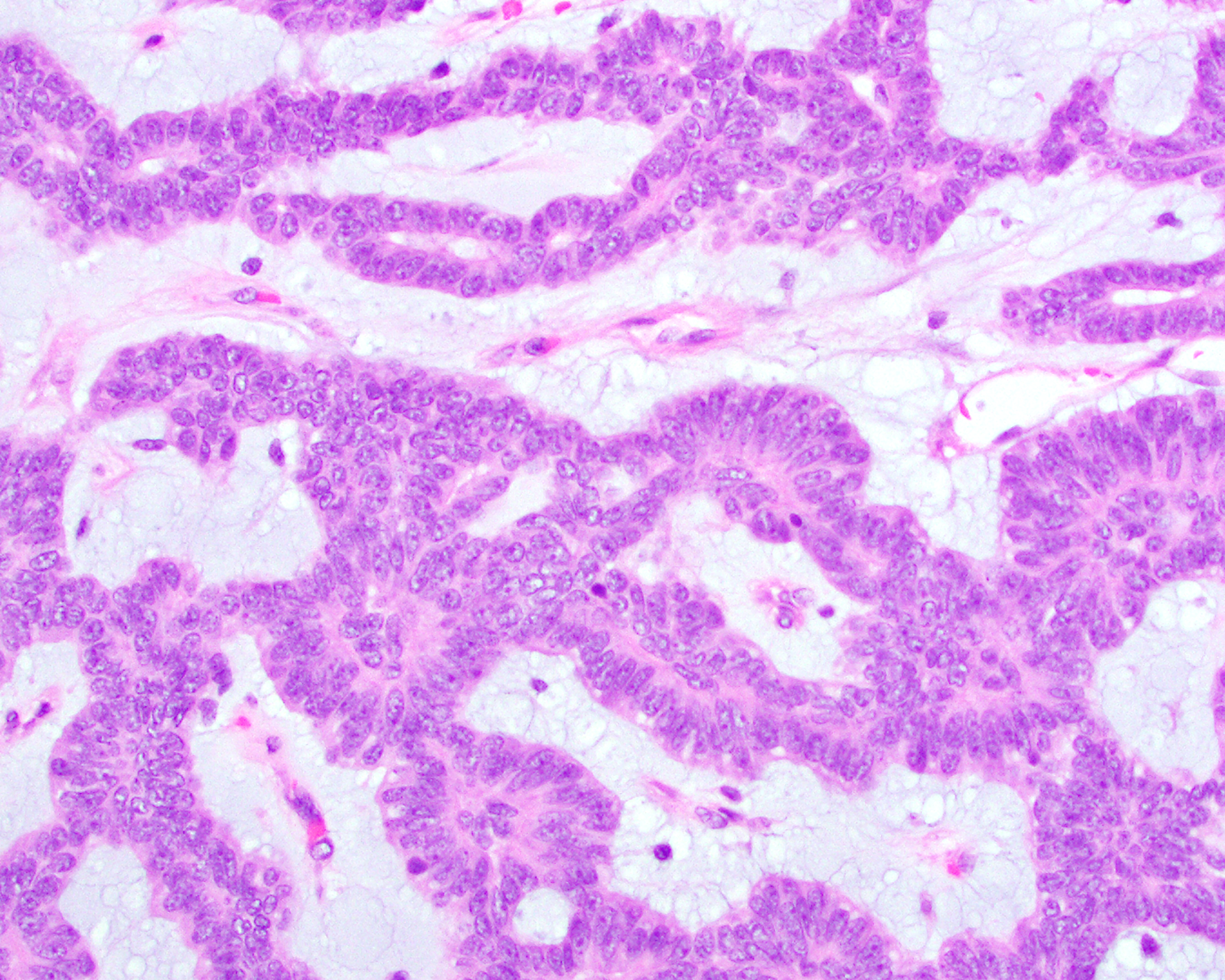
A hematoxylin and eosin stained slide of canalicular adenoma showing beading

The growths often contain are often small bight squamous balls, or morules. They also typically contain a well-developed supporting tissue - a fibrous stroma - which is rich in hyaluronic acid and chondroitin sulphate. In a few cases, the growths may contain small calcium deposits or microliths. Although it is seldom necessary, a pathologist can confirm the existence of canalicular adenoma through immunohistochemistry studies, with the cells reacting with pancytokeratin, S100 protein and SOX10, with a delicate GFAP reaction around the periphery. Although it is a benign tumor, a positive diagnosis of canalicular adenoma may be necessary to exclude the existence of other medical conditions such as a basal cell adenoma, pleomorphic adenoma, adenoid cystic carcinoma, and polymorphous adenocarcinoma.

== Treatment ==
Most instances of canalicular adenoma are treated with conservative surgery.
