= Sialoblastoma =

A sialoblastoma is a low-grade salivary gland neoplasm that recapitulates primitive salivary gland anlage. It has previously been referred to as congenital basal cell adenoma, embryoma, or basaloid adenocarcinoma. It is an extremely rare tumor, with less than 100 cases reported worldwide.

== Signs and symptoms ==
The majority of the tumors are identified in the parotid salivary gland, although the submandibular gland can also be affected. The symptoms are non-specific, but include a mass, frequently rapidly expanding, or ulceration of the skin overlying the mass. In very rare instances, association with other tumors, such as nevus sebaceus and hepatoblastoma are documented. Ultrasound can be used to screen the mass, a technique which can even be performed prenatally. MRI can also be used, but the findings are non-specific.

== Pathology Findings ==
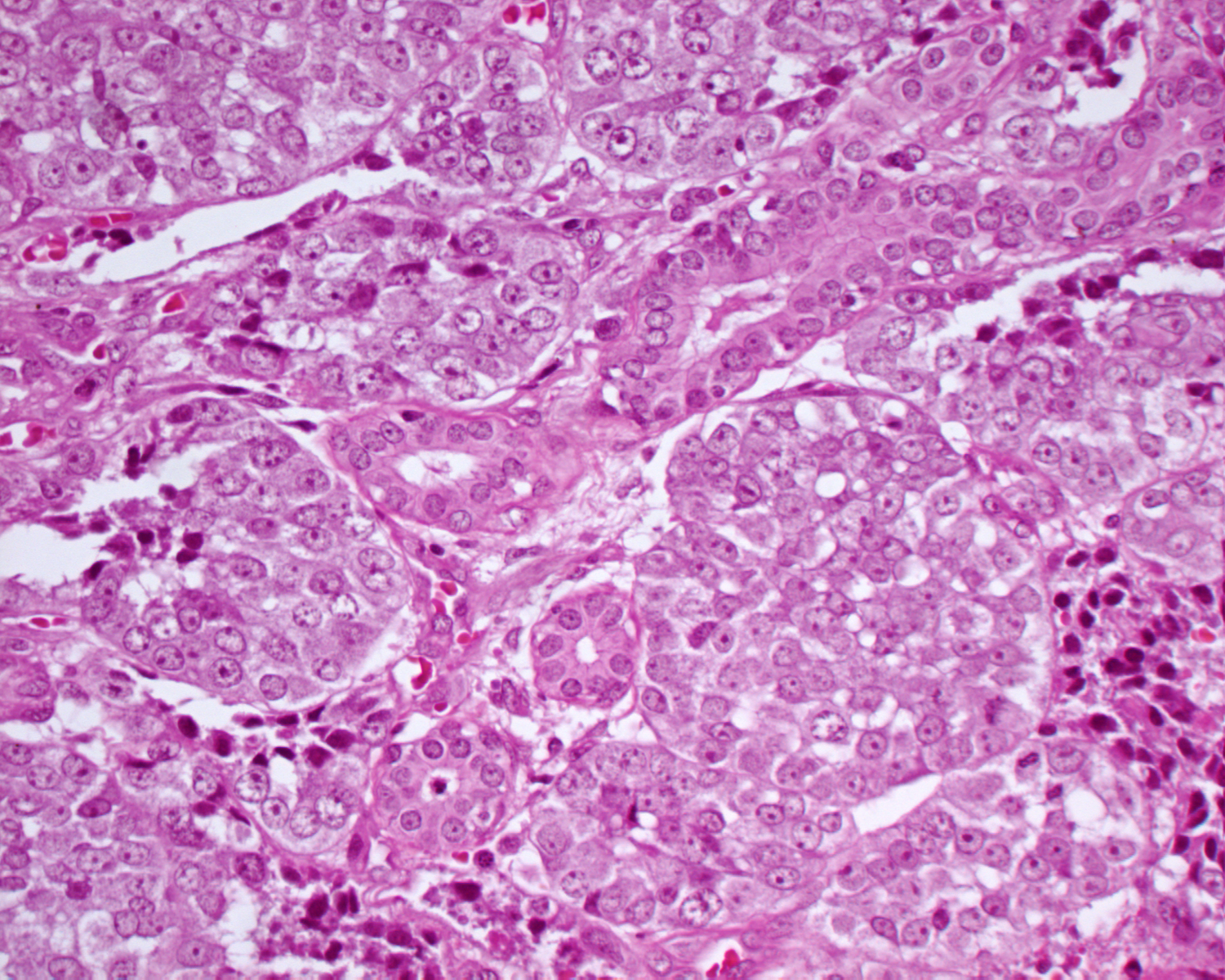
A hematoxylin and eosin stained image (intermediate power) of a sialoblastoma.

The tumors are multinodular or lobular, sometimes showing areas of necrosis or hemorrhage. They range in size from 2–7 cm. As would be expected, the histologic features under the microscope are similar to what would be seen in embryologic development at about the third month. There are two major patterns.

- Favorable pattern: partially encapsulated with bland basaloid cells and intervening stroma.
- Unfavorable pattern: Infiltrating borders with perineural or perivascular invasion.

Both patterns have basaloid cells arranged in solid nests, nodules or trabecula, with focal peripheral palisading. The nuclei are round to oval with delicate chromatin and a usually single nucleolus. Ductules can sometimes be seen. The background stroma is loose, immature and sometimes myxoid. Necrosis can be present. Mitotic figures are often easy to find. Tumor cells can be tested by immunohistochemistry which shows: Ductal cells: positive with keratins, CK7 and CK19. Basaloid or myoepithelial cells: positive with S100 protein, muscle specific actin, calponin and p63. The proliferation marker, Ki-67, may show increased labelling, and when it does, it is associated with an unfavorable outcome.

== Diagnosis ==
It is important that other tumors such as pleomorphic adenoma, basal cell adenoma, adenoid cystic carcinoma, and teratoma be excluded before treatment is started.

== Management ==
Treatment includes complete surgical excision. If the tumor cannot be completely removed, then chemotherapy can be considered. However, chemotherapy may have long term adverse outcomes for patients who are usually very young.

== Epidemiology ==
Most patients are younger than two years, with the majority presenting during the neonatal period. Boys are affected slightly more often than girls (1.2:1).
