= Ductal papilloma =

Group of salivary gland tumors

Ductal papilloma is a group of rare and benign papillary salivary gland tumors arising from the duct system:

- Inverted ductal papilloma
- Sialadenoma papilliferum
- Intraductal papilloma
