= Acinic cell carcinoma of the lung =

- Other names: Fechner tumor, AcCC of the lung
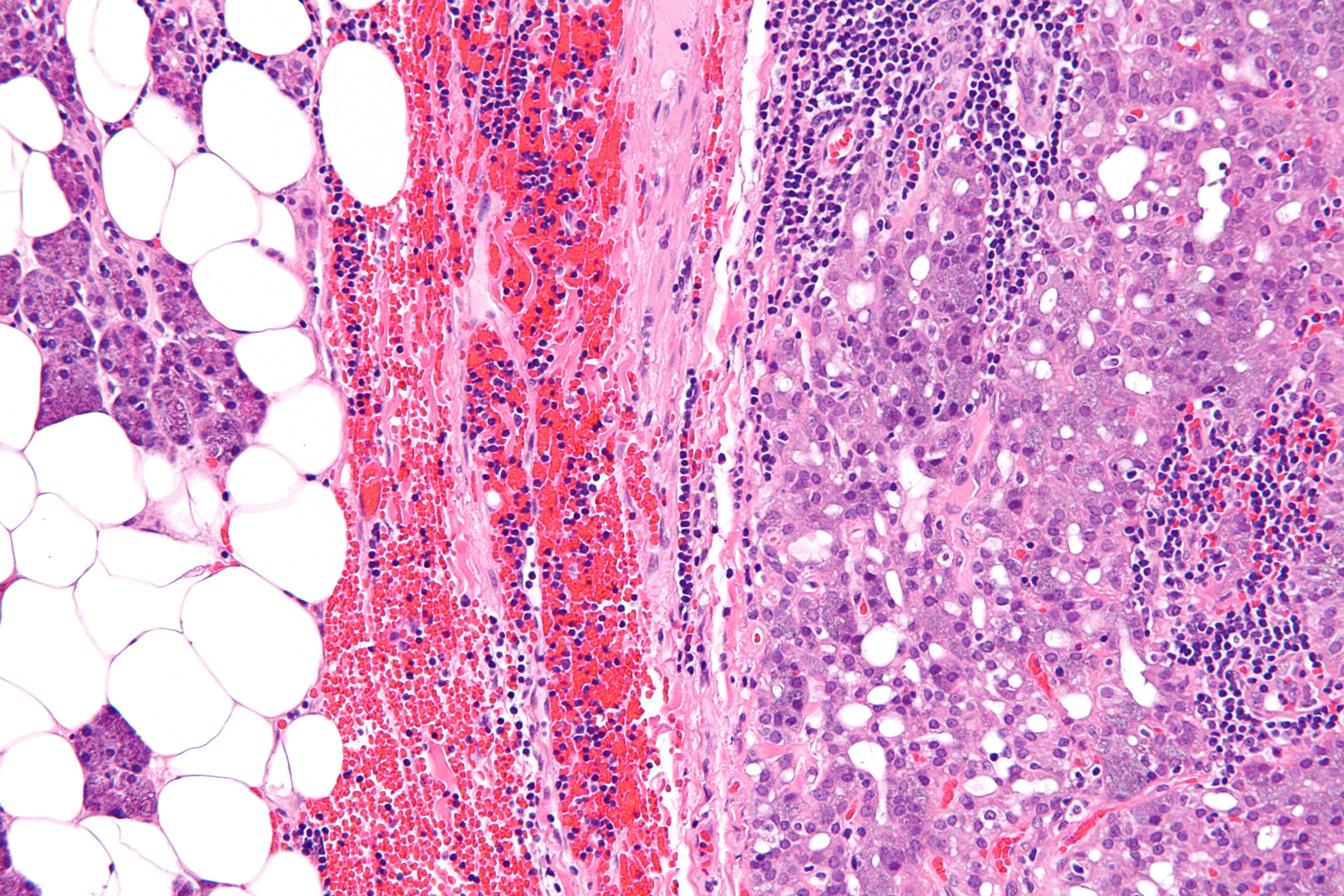
- Very high magnification micrograph of an acinic cell carcinoma, abbreviated AcCC. H&E stain.
- Specialty: Oncology, Pulmonology

Acinic cell carcinoma of the lung is a very uncommon tumor that typically appears close to the right bronchus. As of 2022, only 29 cases have been documented in the English literature since Fechner et al. first described this entity in 1972. Histologically similar to the major and minor salivary glands, pluripotent cells of the submucosal serous and mucous glands of the tracheobronchial tree are thought to be the source of acinic cell carcinoma of the lung. The histologic characteristics of acinic cell carcinoma of the lung are nearly identical to those of the salivary glands.

== Signs and symptoms ==
Hemostasis and cough were the most common clinical symptoms. Many times, patients have no symptoms. Tumors were typically small, seldom growing larger than 4 cm. The right bronchus was most likely to be affected by the tumor, then the left bronchus and trachea.

== Diagnosis ==
Prior to making a diagnosis of primary acinic cell carcinoma of the lung, a comprehensive clinical history, physical examination, and imaging studies are necessary due to the indolent nature of primary acinic cell carcinoma of the salivary gland and its potential for metastasis after extended latency.

Primary acinic cell carcinoma of the lung is particularly difficult to diagnose histologically because the primary basis for the diagnosis is morphological features. Fechner et al. initially reported on two cell populations in primary acinic cell carcinoma of the lung: a majority of light cells, akin to acinic cell tumor of the parotid gland, and dark cells, resembling normal serous cells of the bronchial submucosal glands.

When compared to the traditional "blue dot" appearance of acinic cell carcinomas originating from the parotid gland, the majority of primary pulmonary acinic cell carcinomas exhibit a mixture of clear and eosinophilic granular cytoplasm. This discrepancy can be attributed to the pulmonary submucosal gland's serous cells secreting a low concentration of peptides, proteins, and small organic molecules acting as antimicrobials, as well as the fact that they do not produce digestive zymogen. As a result, PAS-D stain weak positivity or negativity was noted. When assessing pulmonary ACC, immunohistochemical stains are not very useful because they show an immunoprofile that is typical of serous epithelial cells. EMA and cytokeratins typically cause immunoreactivity in these tumors. S100, lysozyme, and chromogranin are all negative. Amylase and α-1-antichymotrypsin have unreliable immunoreactivity.

== See also ==
- Acinic cell carcinoma
- Lung cancer
