= Sebaceous lymphadenoma =

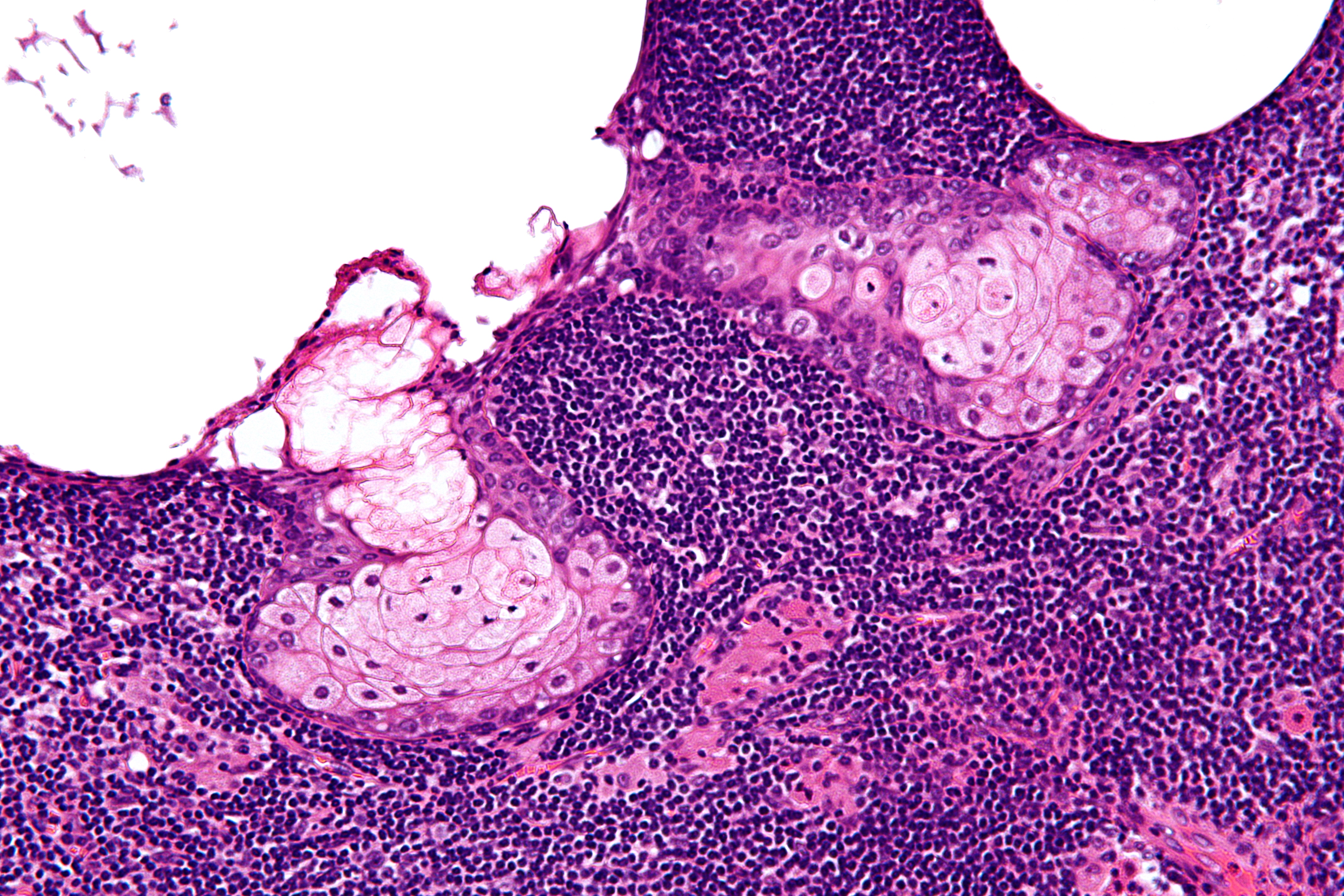
- High magnification micrograph of a sebaceous lymphadenoma. H&E stain.
- Specialty: ENT surgery

Sebaceous lymphadenoma is a benign tumour of the salivary gland.

== Diagnosis ==
Sebaceous lymphadenoma is a tissue diagnosis, e.g. salivary gland biopsy.

It may be confused with a number of benign and malignant neoplasms, including Warthin tumour, mucoepidermoid carcinoma and sebaceous lymphadenocarcinoma.

== Treatment ==
The treatment is simple excision and exclusion of a malignant neoplasm.

== See also ==
- Lymph node
- Lymphoma
- Salivary gland neoplasm
