= Acinic cell carcinoma =

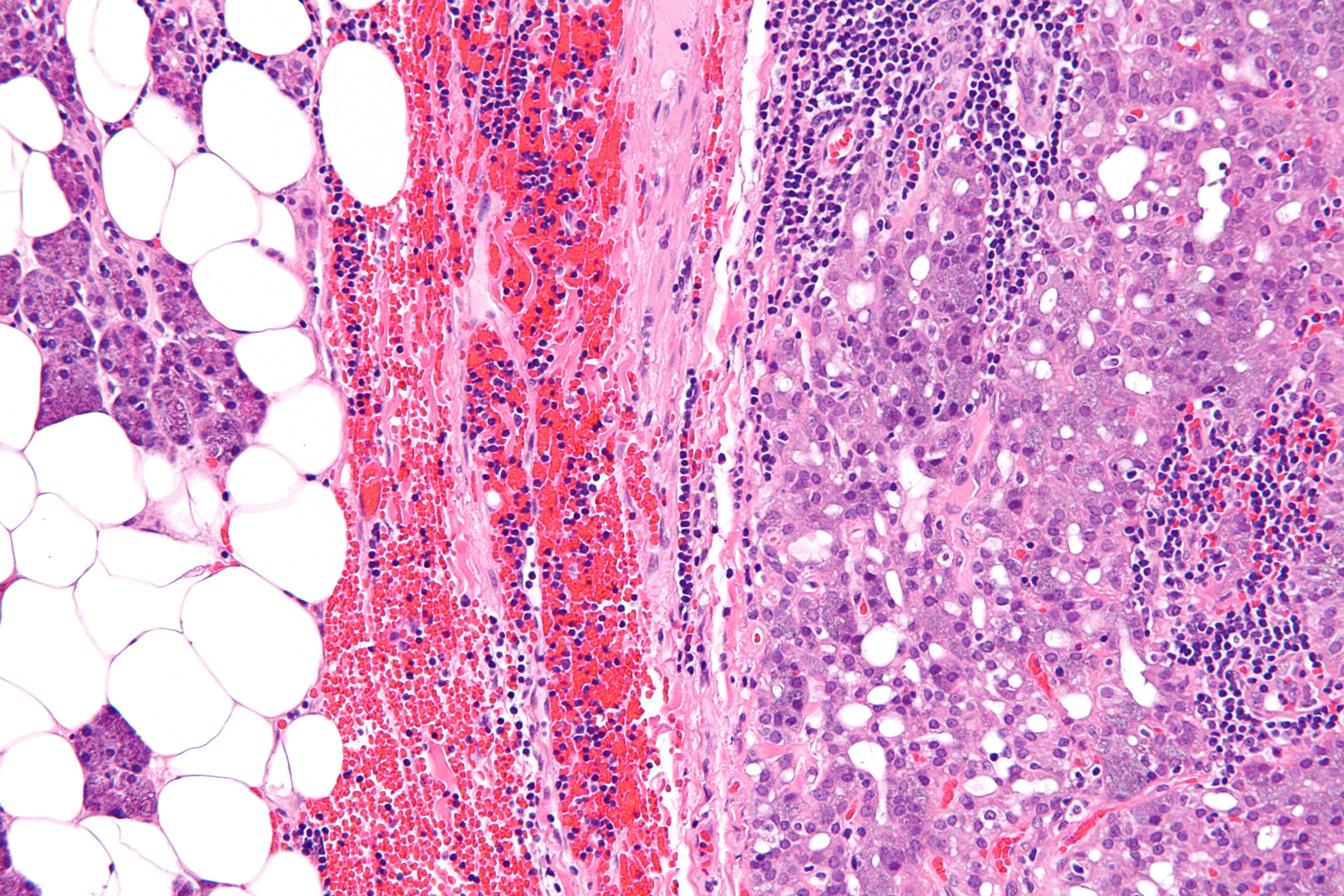
- Micrograph of an acinic cell carcinoma (right of image) and acinar glands (parotid gland - left of image). H&E stain.
- Specialty: ENT surgery

Acinic cell carcinoma is a malignant tumor representing 2% of all salivary tumors. 90% of the time found in the parotid gland, 10% intraorally on buccal mucosa or palate. The disease presents as a slow growing mass, associated with pain or tenderness in 50% of the cases. Often appears pseudoencapsulated.

== Diagnosis ==
Basophilic, bland cells similar to acinar cells. Growth pattern: solid - acinar cells, microcytic - small cystic spaces mucinous or eosinophilic, papillary-cystic - large cystic lined by epithelium, follicular - similar to thyroid tissue.

These tumors, which resemble serous acinar cells, vary in their behavior from locally aggressive to blatantly malignant.

It can also appear in the breast. The pancreatic form of acinic cell carcinoma is a rare subtype of exocrine pancreatic cancer. Exocrine pancreatic cancers are the most common form of pancreatic cancer when compared to endocrine pancreatic cancer.

Acinic cell carcinomas arise most frequently in the parotid gland. Other sites of primary tumors have included the submandibular gland and other major and minor salivary glands. There have been rare cases of primary tumors involving the parapharyngeal space and the sublingual gland.

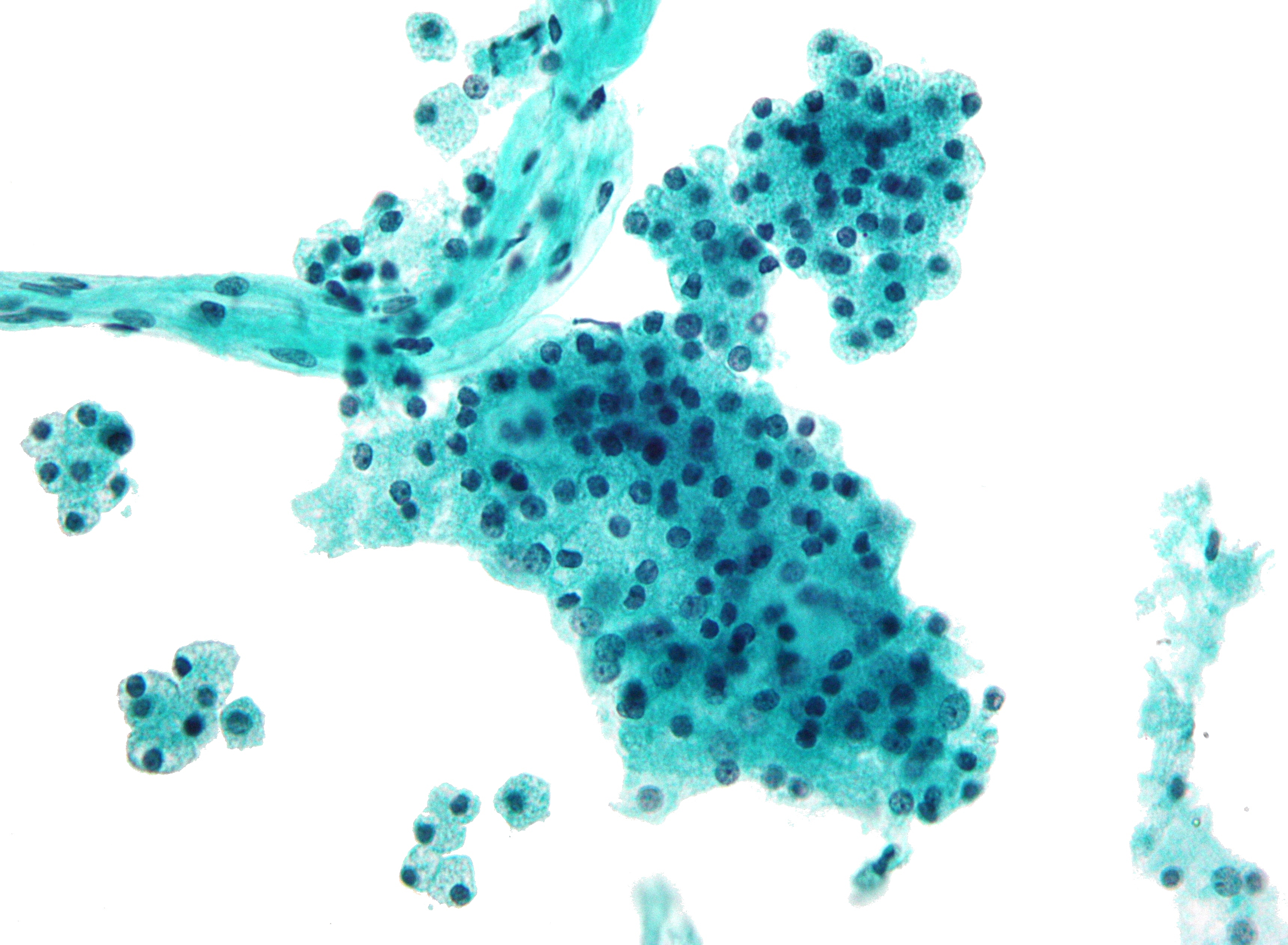
Micrograph of acinic cell carcinoma. Pap stain. Fine needle aspiration specimen.

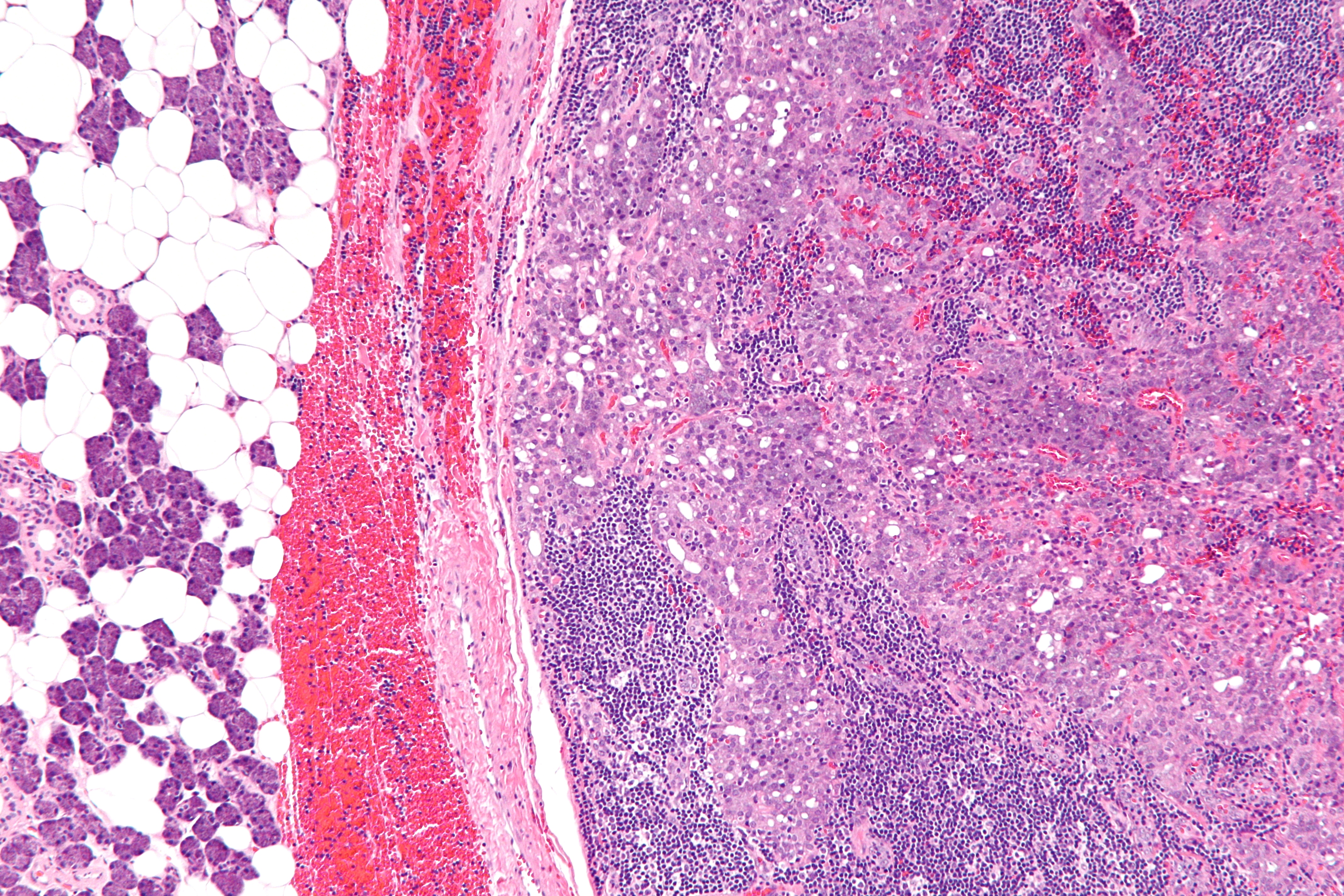
Intermed. mag.

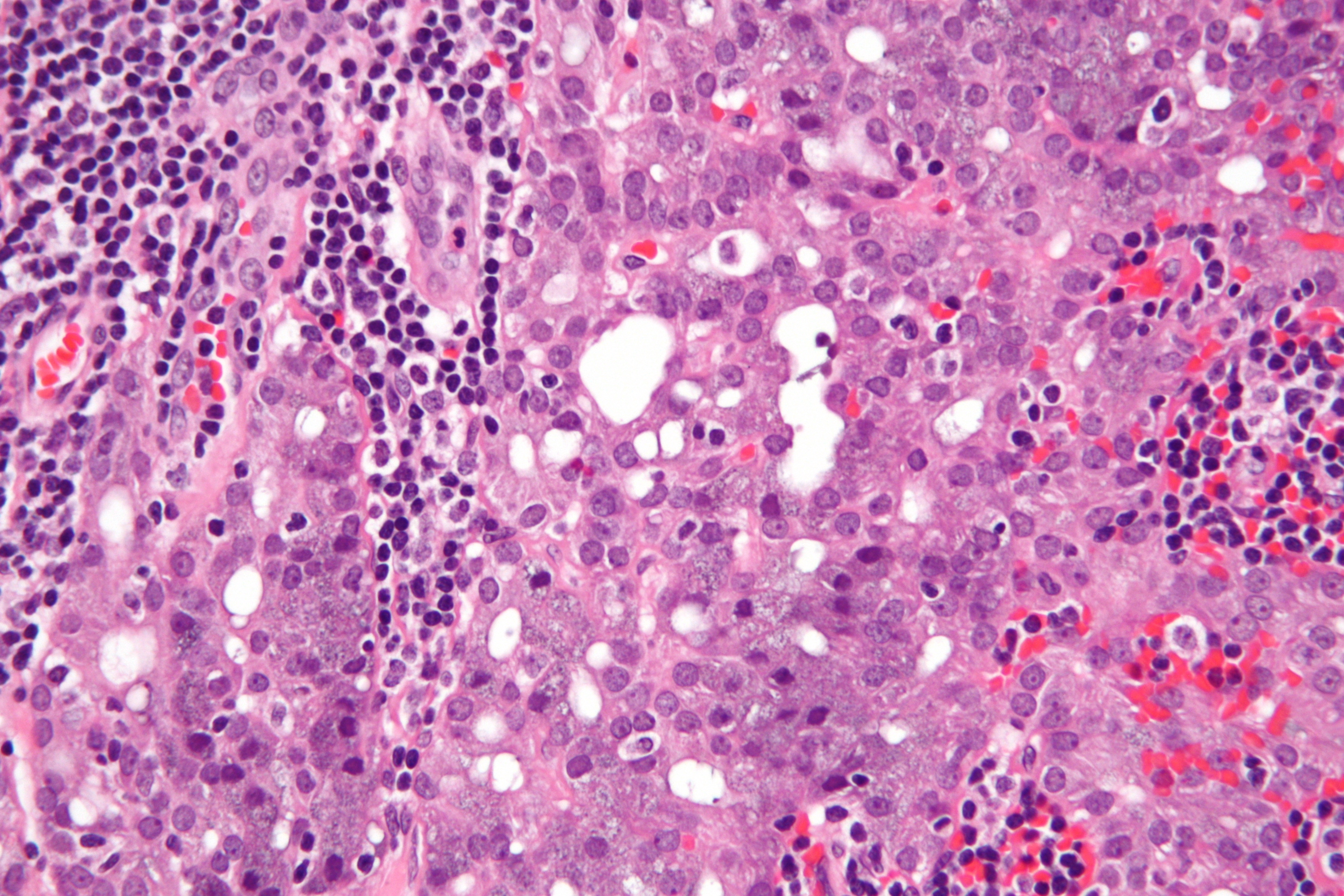
Very high mag.

== Prognosis ==
Prognosis is good for acinic cell carcinoma of the parotid gland, with five-year survival rates approaching 90%, and 20-year survival exceeding 50%. Patients with acinic cell carcinomas with high grade transformation (sometimes also called dedifferentiation) have significantly worse survival.

The prognosis of an acinic cell carcinoma originating in the lung is much more guarded than cases of this rare histotype occurring in most other organs, but is still considerably better than for other types of lung cancer.

== Treatment ==
1. Surgical resection is mainstay of treatment, whenever possible. If tumor is completely removed, post-operative radiation therapy is typically not needed since acinic cell carcinoma is considered a low-grade histology. Post-operative radiation therapy for acinic cell carcinoma is used if:
  1. margins are positive
  2. incomplete resection
  3. tumor invades beyond gland
  4. positive lymph nodes
2. Neutron beam radiation
3. Conventional radiation
4. Chemotherapy

== Epidemiology ==
Acinic cell carcinoma appears in all age groups, but presents at a younger median age (approx. 52 years) than most other salivary gland cancers. Occurrences in children are quite common. Salivary gland cancers seem on the rise in many Western Nations and their risk factors are still the challenges ahead, not being fully identified. Among the known risk factors there are external and internal radioactive exposure, as iodine and caesium radionuclides.

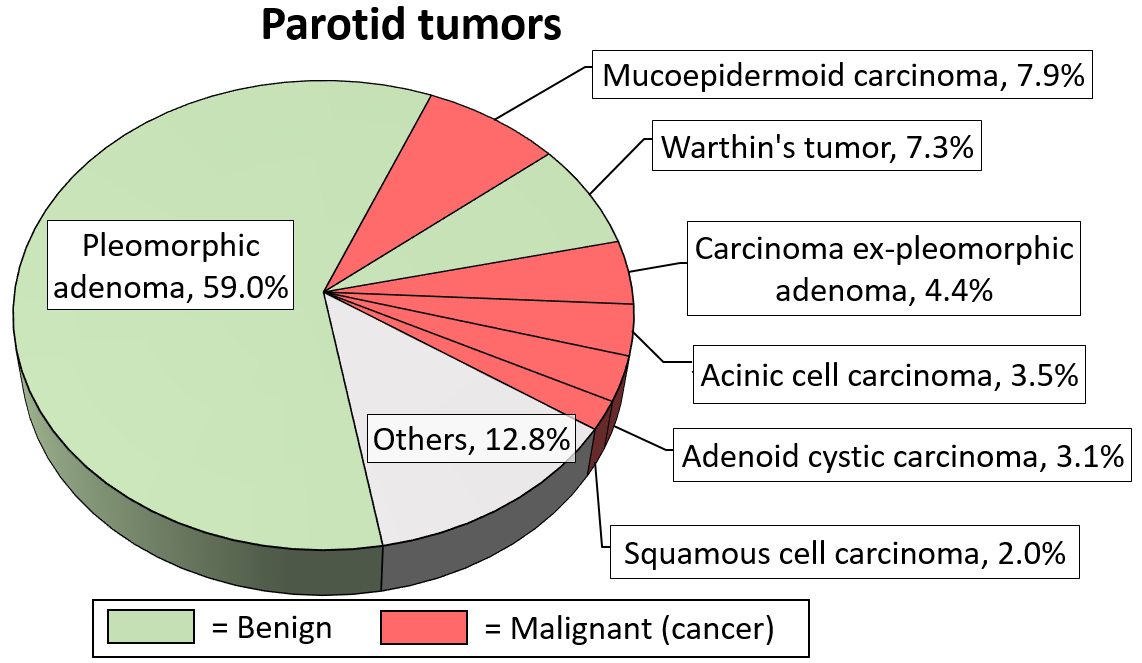
Relative incidence of parotid tumors, showing carcinoma ex pleomorphic adenoma at right.

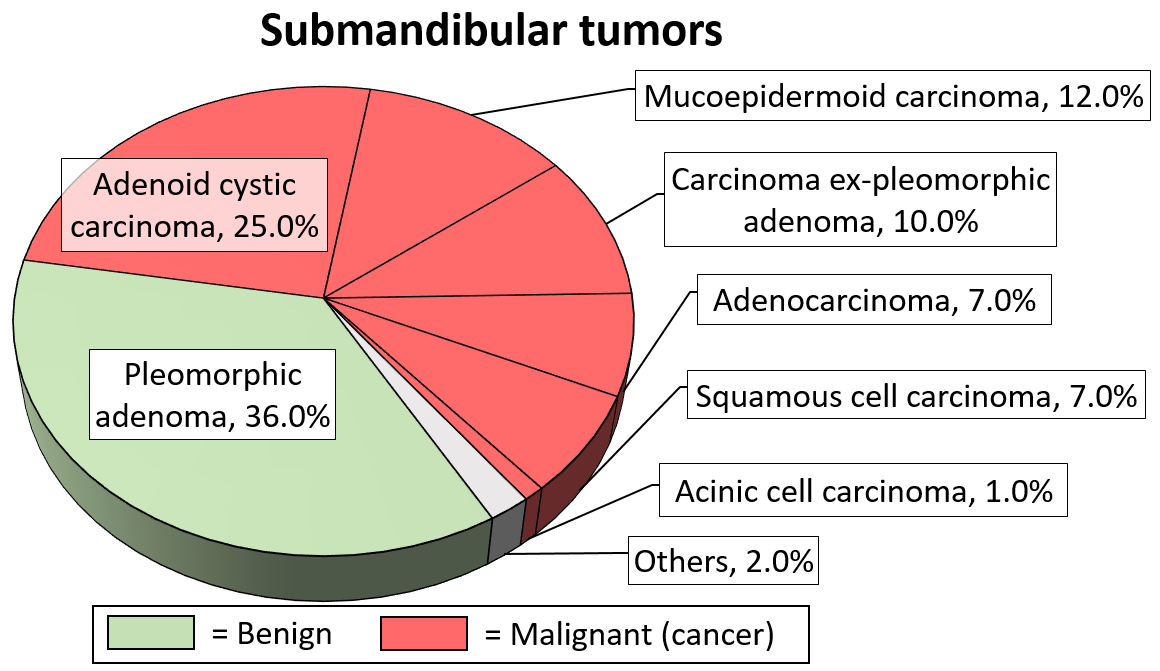
Relative incidence of submandibular tumors, showing carcinoma ex pleomorphic adenoma at bottom-right.

== Acinic cell carcinoma of the lung ==
Acinic cell carcinoma of the lung is a very rare variant of lung cancer that, in this organ, is classified among the salivary gland-like carcinoma of the lung. Fewer than 1% of malignancies beginning in the lower respiratory tract are acinic cell carcinomas.
