= Carcinoma ex pleomorphic adenoma =

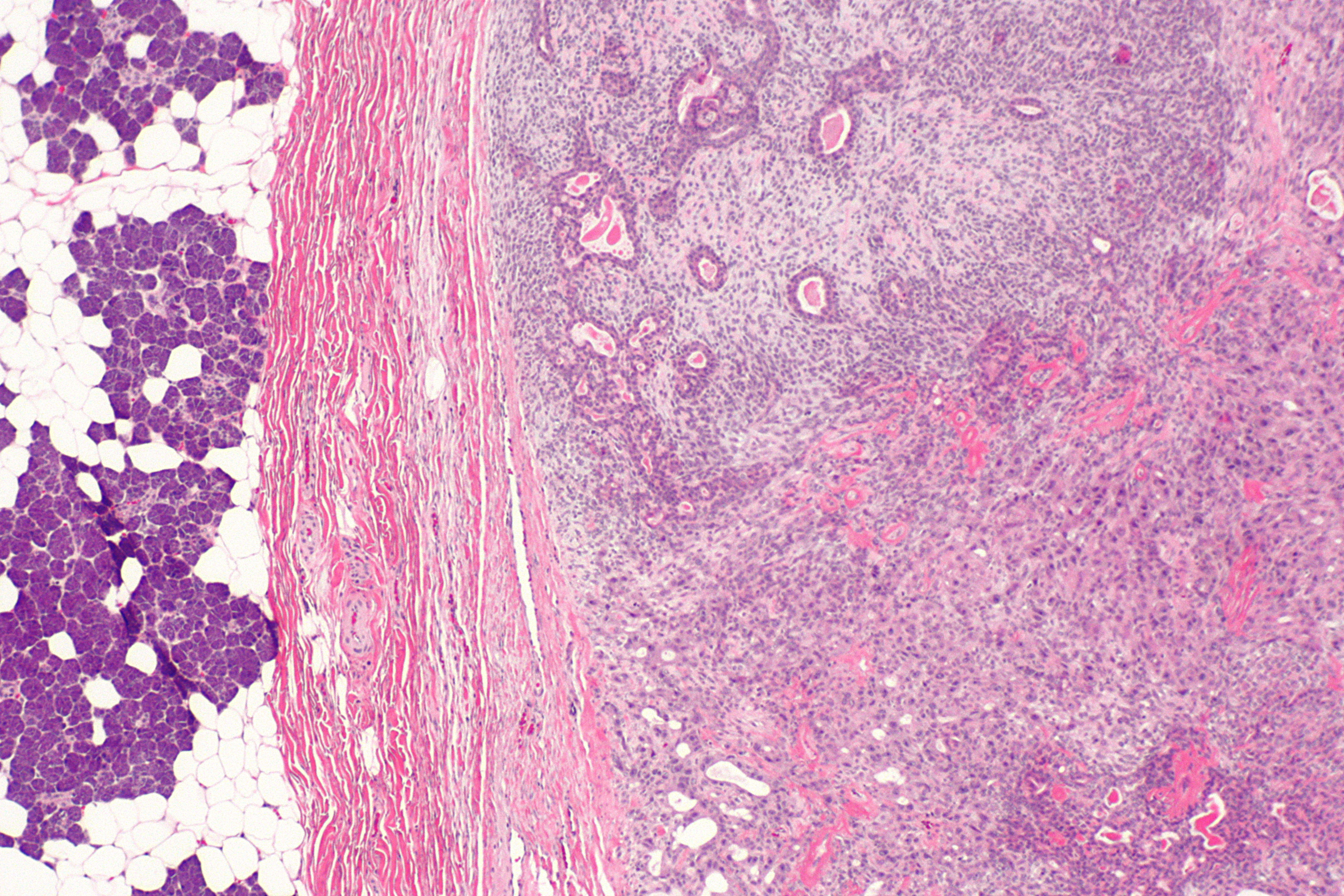
- Micrograph of a carcinoma ex pleomorphic adenoma. The carcinoma component is on the lower right of the image. Benign parotid gland is seen at the left and pleomorphic adenoma is seen at the upper right. H&E stain.
- Specialty: Oncology

Carcinoma ex pleomorphic adenoma (ca ex PA) is a type of cancer typically found in the parotid gland. It arises from the benign tumour pleomorphic adenoma.

Its prognosis depends on the stage. Early tumours have essentially a benign behaviour.

== Signs and symptoms ==
The signs and symptoms are similar to other malignant salivary gland tumours; however, it may have been preceded by an appreciable mass that was long-standing and did not appear to be growing.

Findings that suggest a malignant salivary gland tumour include rapid growth, facial weakness (due to facial nerve compression), pain, skin ulceration, fixation of the mastoid tip and parasthesias.

== Diagnosis ==
Carcinoma ex pleomorphic adenoma is diagnosed by examining it under the microscope with consideration of the individual history.

In approximately 75% of cases ca ex PAs arise in a pleomorphic adenoma that is apparent when the tumour is excised. In the other approximately 25% of cases the individual had a pleomorphic adenoma excised previously and the diagnosis is made based on (1) the presence of a carcinoma, and (2) the history of a pleomorphic adenoma at that location.

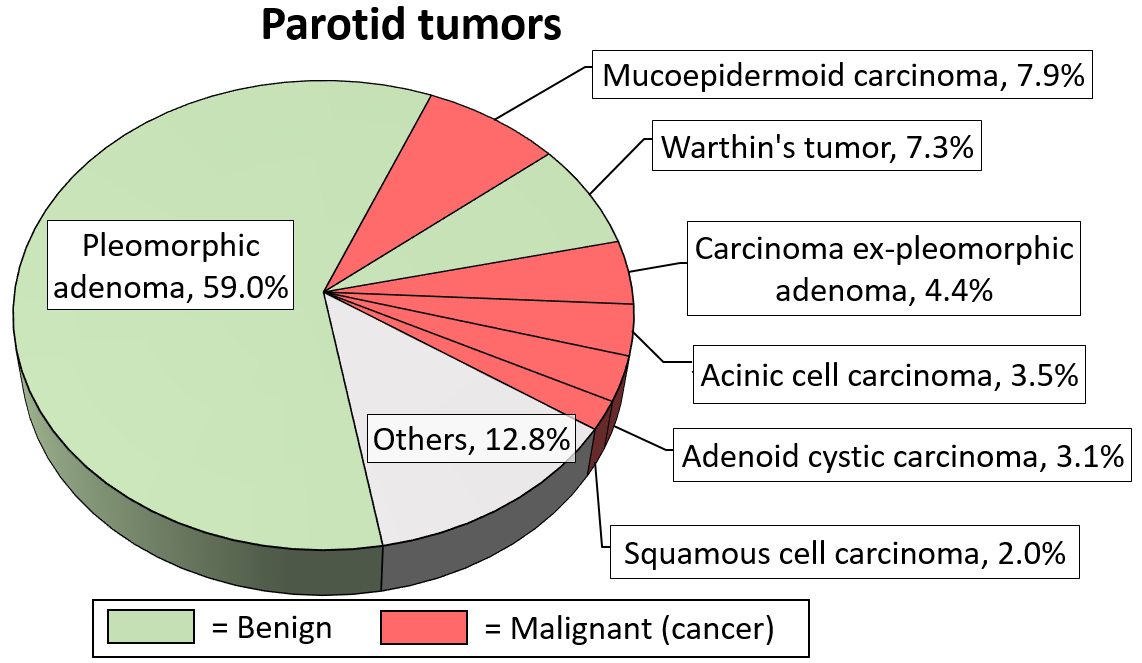
Relative incidence of parotid tumors, showing carcinoma ex pleomorphic adenoma at right.

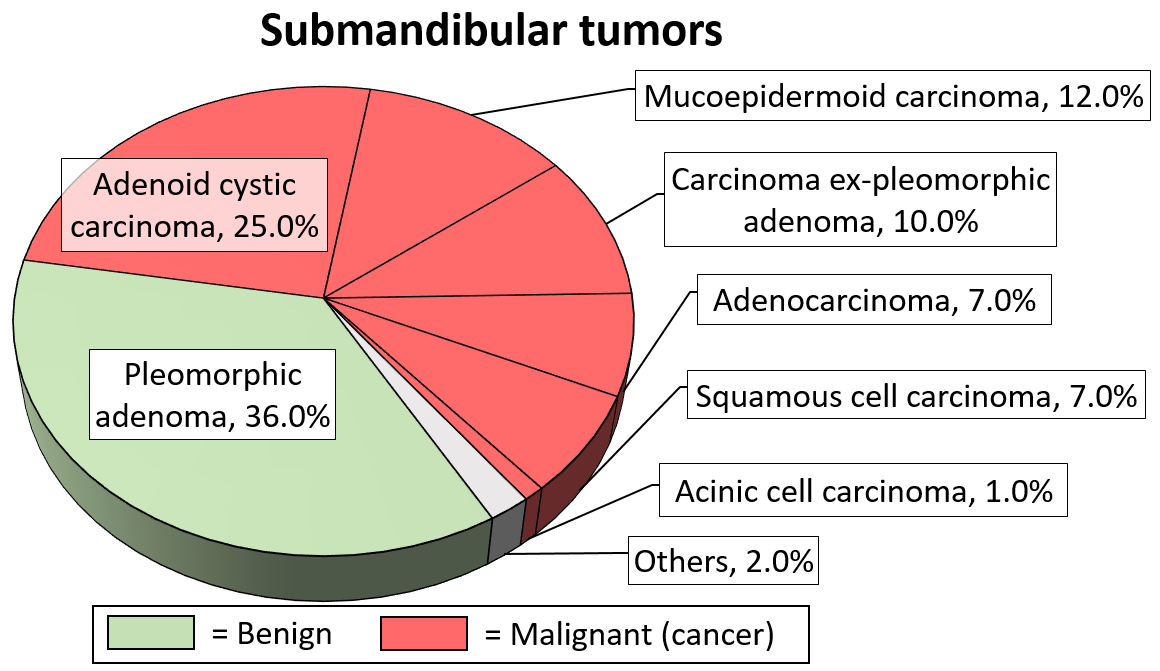
Relative incidence of submandibular tumors, showing carcinoma ex pleomorphic adenoma at top-right.

== See also ==
- Salivary gland
- Pleomorphic adenoma
