= Warthin's tumor =

Benign tumor of the salivary glands

Warthin tumor
- Other names: Warthin's tumour, monomorphic adenoma, adenolymphoma
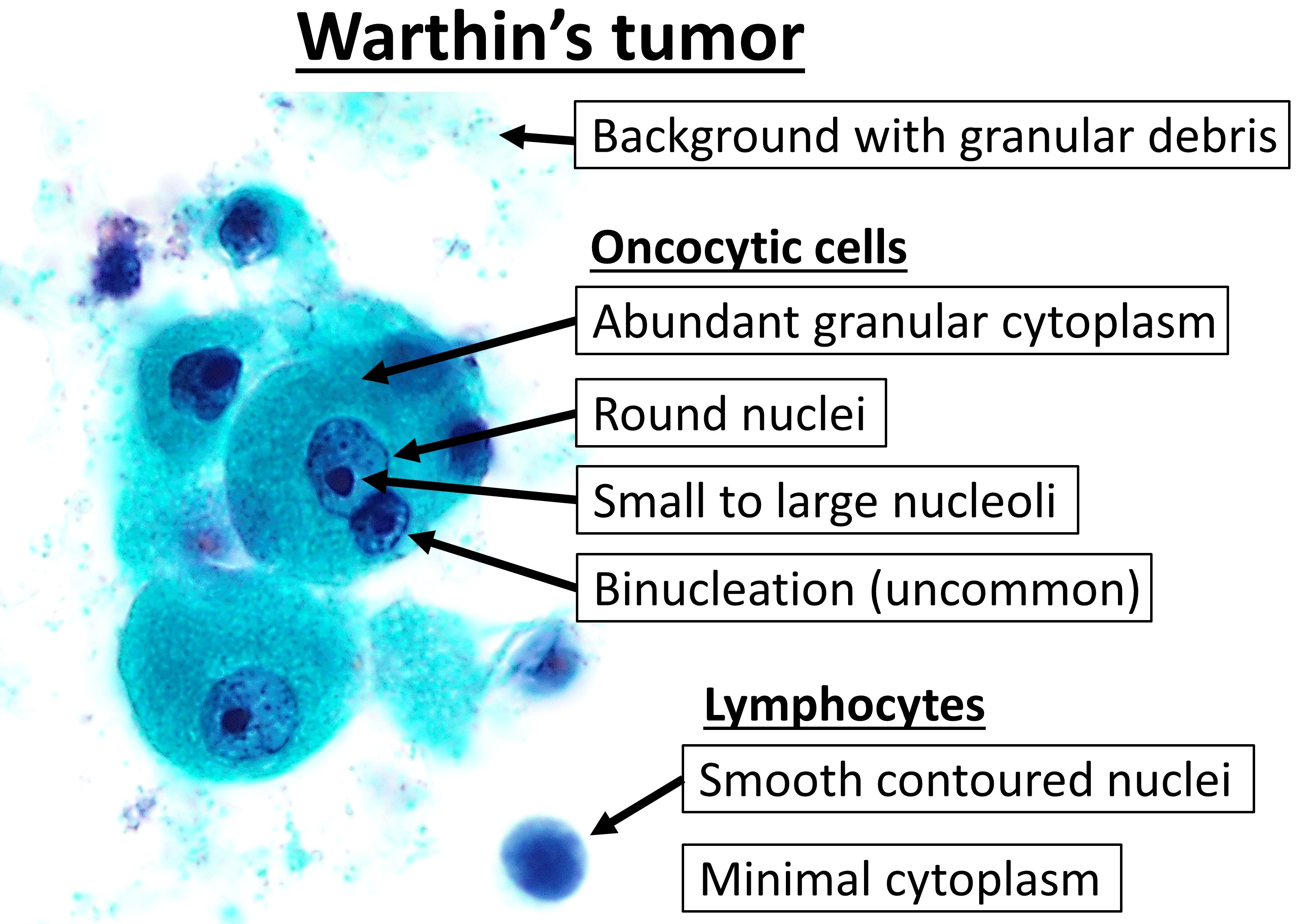
- Cytopathology of Warthin tumor, with typical cellular features (and a relatively uncommon binucleated cell). Pap stain.
- Specialty: Oncology

Warthin tumor, also known as papillary cystadenoma lymphomatosum, is a benign cystic tumor of the salivary glands containing abundant lymphocytes and germinal centers (lymph node-like stroma). It is named for pathologist Aldred Scott Warthin, who described two cases in 1929.

== Signs and symptoms ==
Warthin tumor primarily affects older individuals (age 60–70 years). There is a slight male predilection according to recent studies. The tumor is slow growing, painless, and usually appears in the tail of the parotid gland near the angle of the mandible. In 5–14% of cases, Warthin tumor is bilateral, but the two masses usually are at different times. Warthin tumor is highly unlikely to become malignant.

=== Locations ===
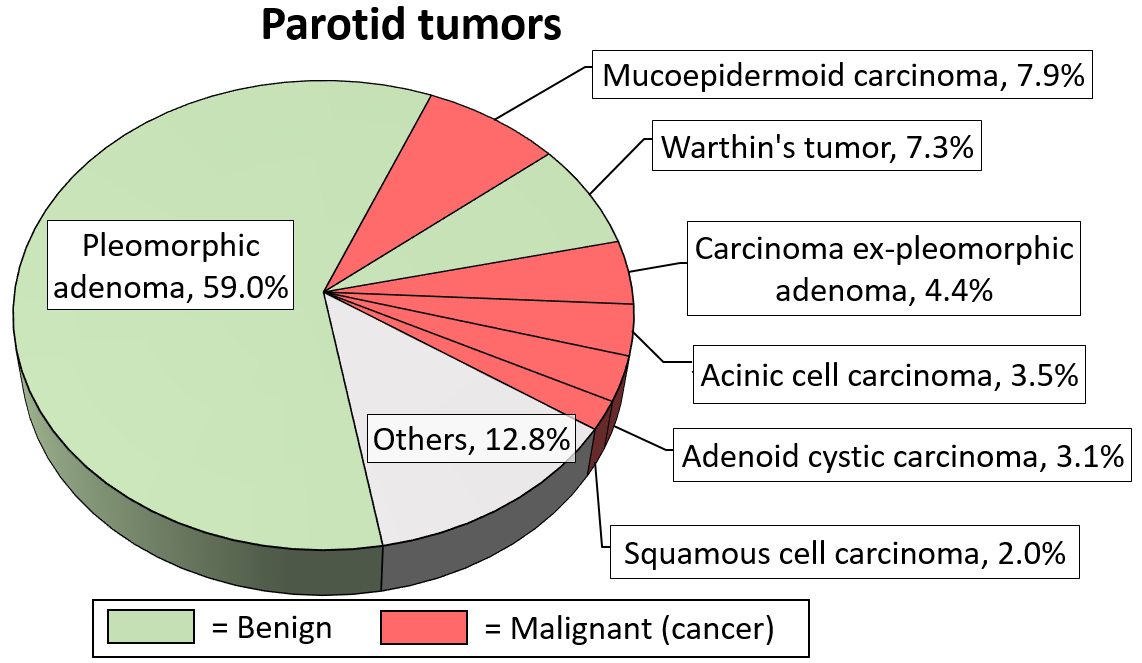
Relative incidence of parotid tumors, with Warthin tumor near top right.

The gland most likely affected is the parotid gland. In fact, it is the only tumor virtually restricted to the parotid gland. Warthin tumor is the second most common benign parotid tumor after pleomorphic adenoma, but its prevalence is steadily increasing.

== Cause ==
Its cause is unknown, but there is a strong association with cigarette smoking. Smokers are at 8 times greater risk of developing Warthin tumor than the general population.

== Diagnosis ==
The appearance of this tumor under the microscope is unique. There are cystic spaces surrounded by two uniform rows of oncocytes, which are epithelial cells with abundant, granular, eosinophilic cytoplasm. The cystic spaces have epithelium referred to as papillary infoldings that protrude into them. Additionally, the epithelium has lymphoid stroma with germinal center formation.

The differential diagnosis includes sebaceous lymphadenoma and oncocytoma.

This Warthin tumor presented as a parotid mass in a middle-aged male, who underwent superficial parotidectomy. The tumor, at the right of the image, is well-demarcated from the adjacent parotid tissue and tends to shell out from it.

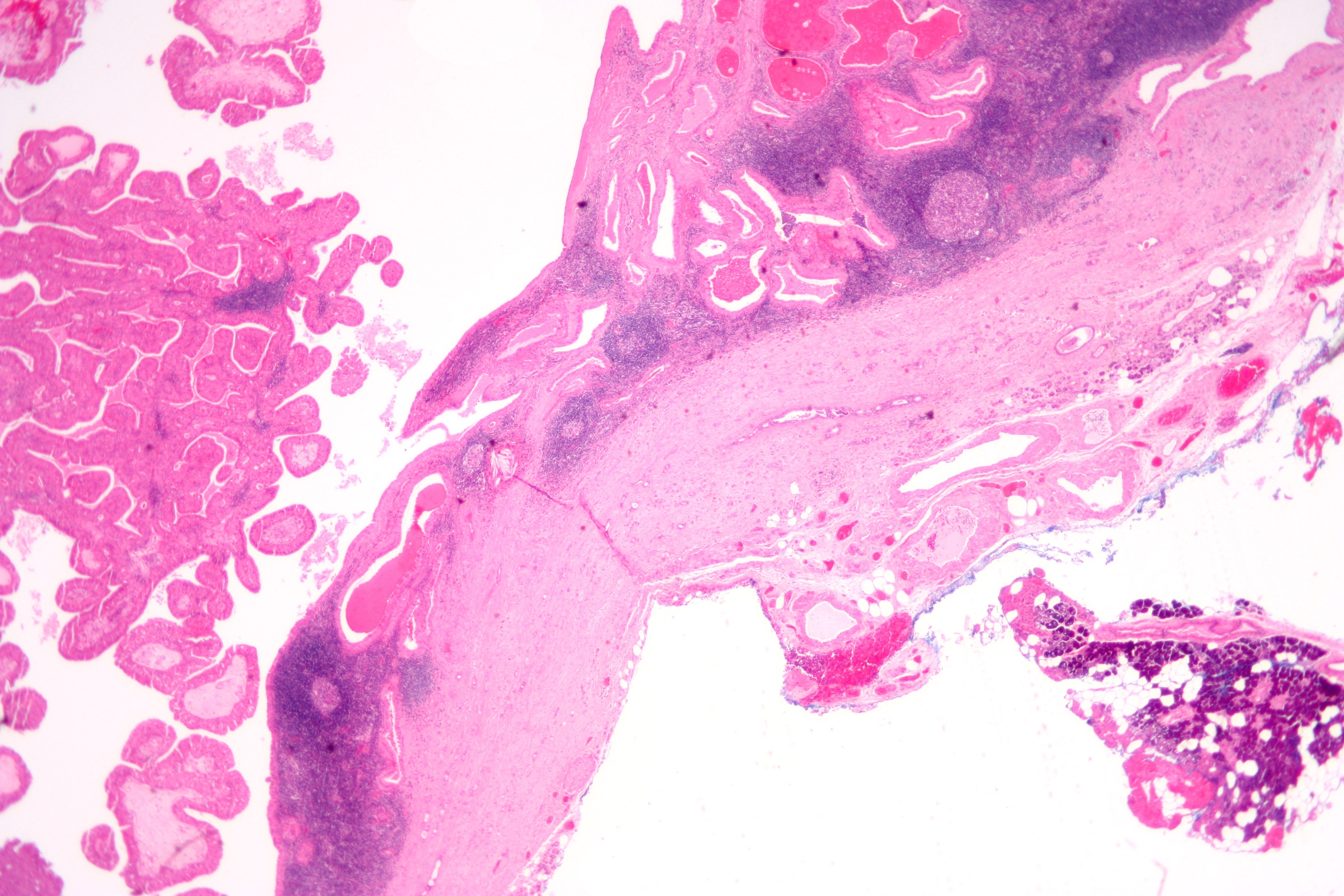
Low magnification micrograph of a Warthin tumor arising from the parotid gland.

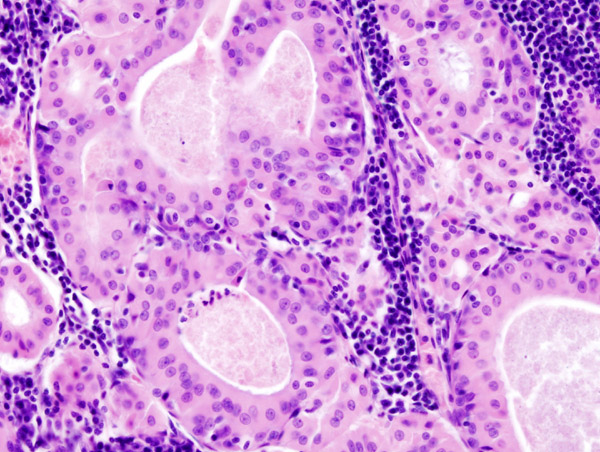
Histopathology of Warthin tumor in the parotid gland. H&E stain.

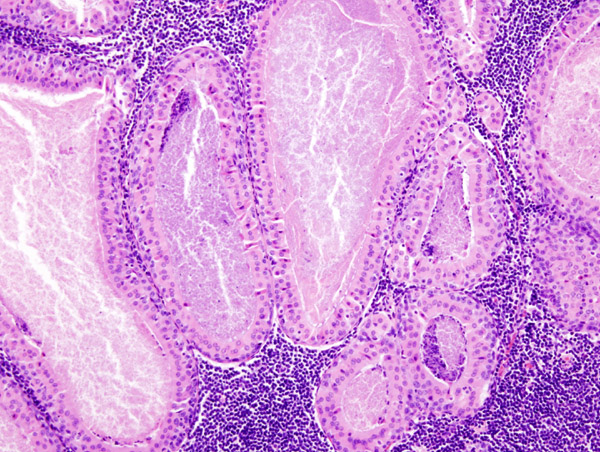
Histopathology of Warthin tumor in the parotid gland. Another view of a file "Warthin tumor (1).jpg". H&E stain.

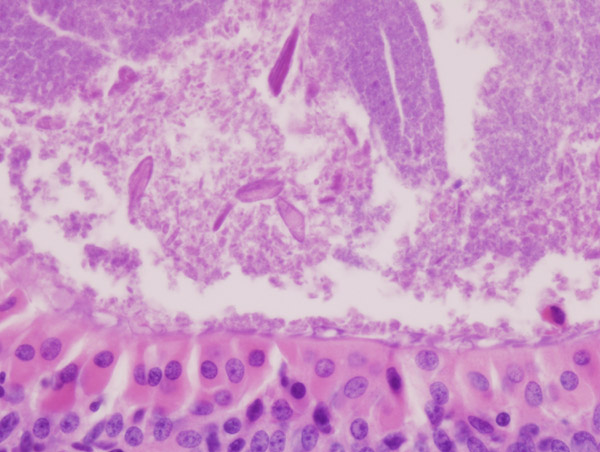
Histopathology of Warthin tumor in the parotid gland. Higher magnification of a file "Warthin tumor (1).jpg". H&E stain.

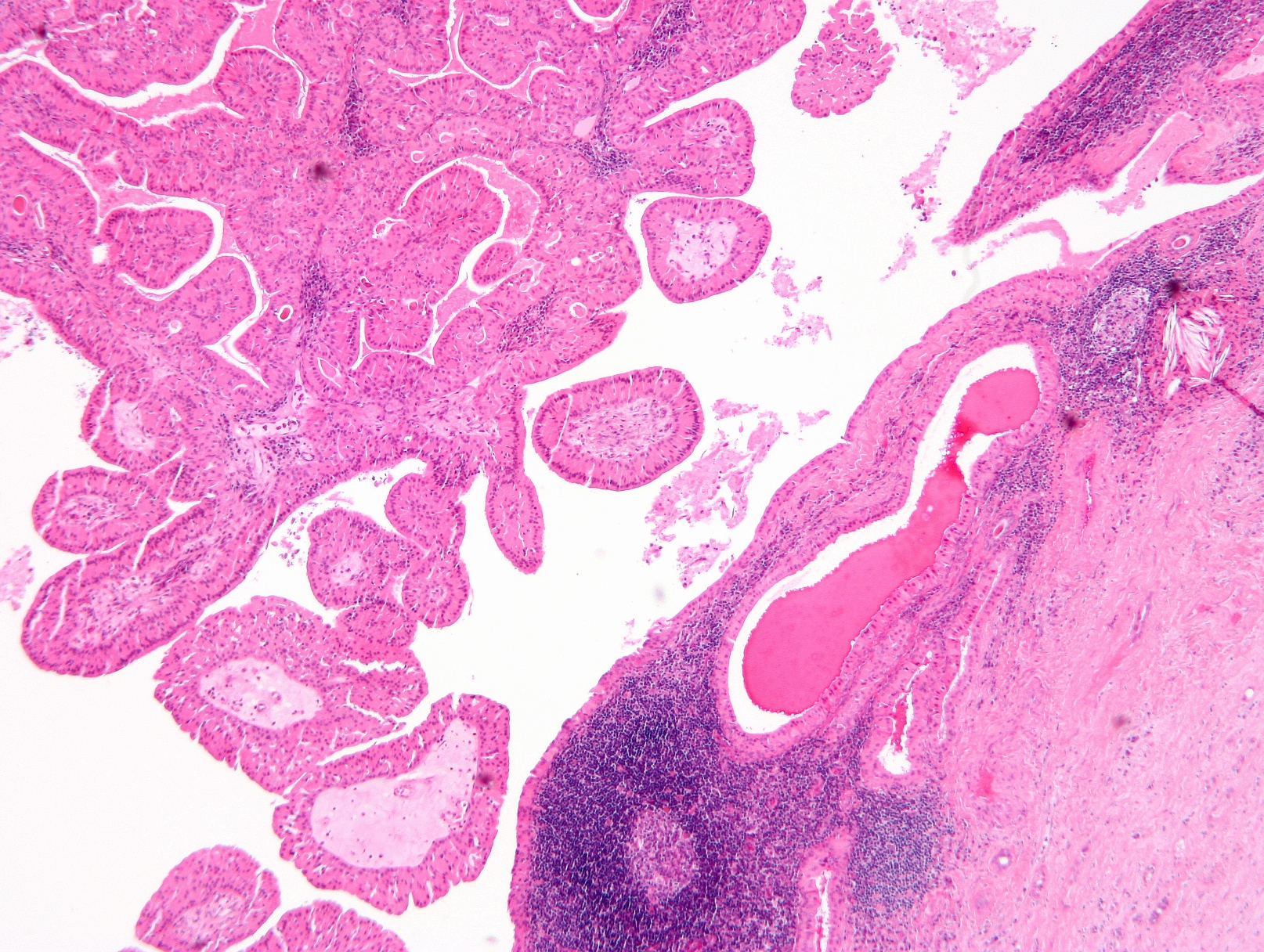
Intermediate magnification micrograph of a Warthin tumor.

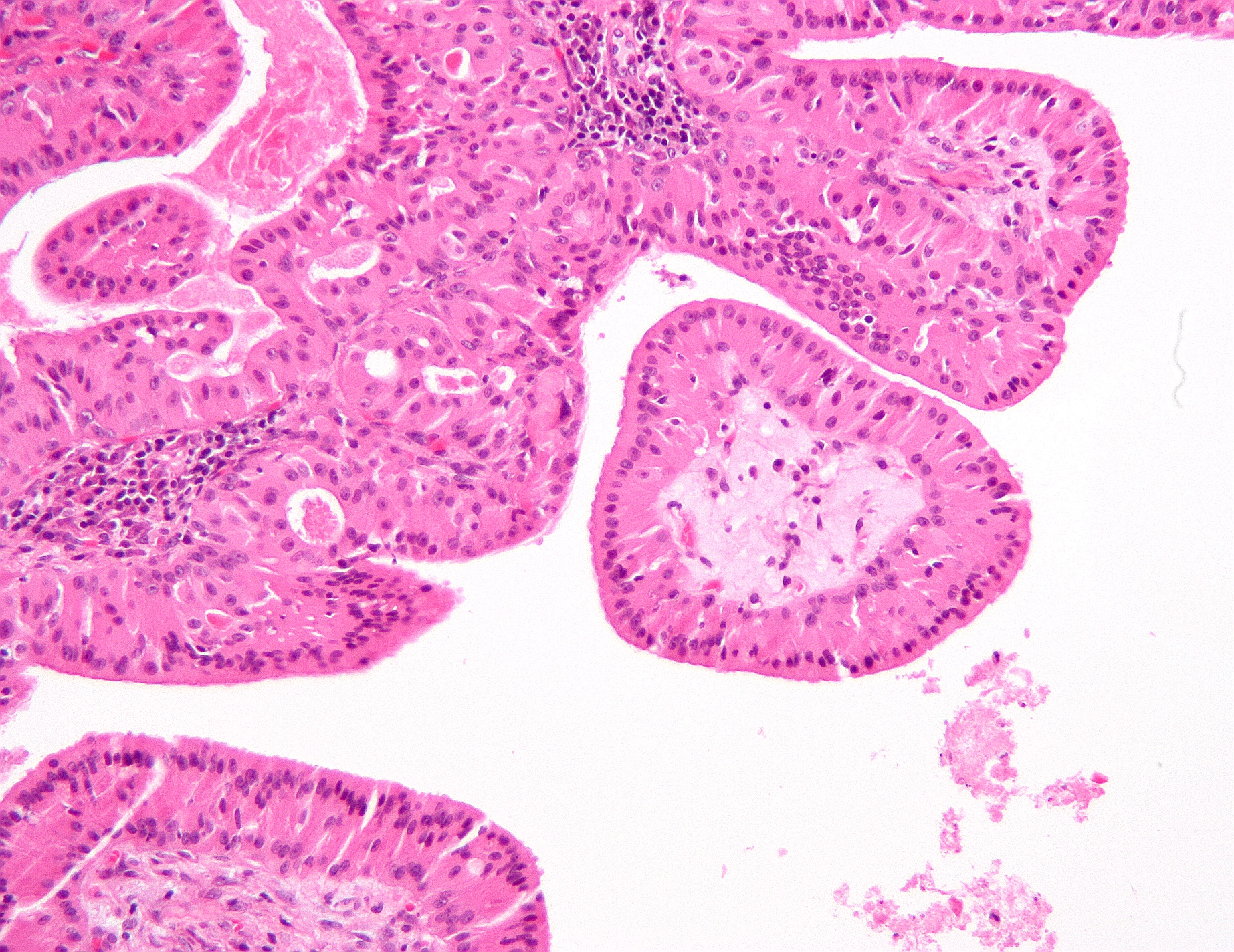
High magnification micrograph of a Warthin tumor showing the characteristic bilayered epithelium.

== Treatment ==
Most of these tumors are treated with surgical removal called parotidectomy. Contrary to pleomorphic adenoma, it is non recurrent.

== See also ==
- Pleomorphic adenoma

== Additional sources ==
- Kahn, Michael A. Basic Oral and Maxillofacial Pathology. Volume 1. 2001.
