= Basal cell adenoma =

Salivary gland tumour

Basal cell adenoma is a rare, low-grade benign salivary gland neoplasm.

The most common involved site is the parotid gland, however other possible sites include the submandibular gland, minor salivary glands of upper lip, buccal mucosa, palate and nasal septum.

It appears as a slow-growing, firm and mobile mass.

Treatment is by surgical excision with a margin of healthy tissue. Although the recurrence rate is high, the prognosis is generally good.
