= Pleomorphic adenoma =

- Other names: Benign mixed tumor
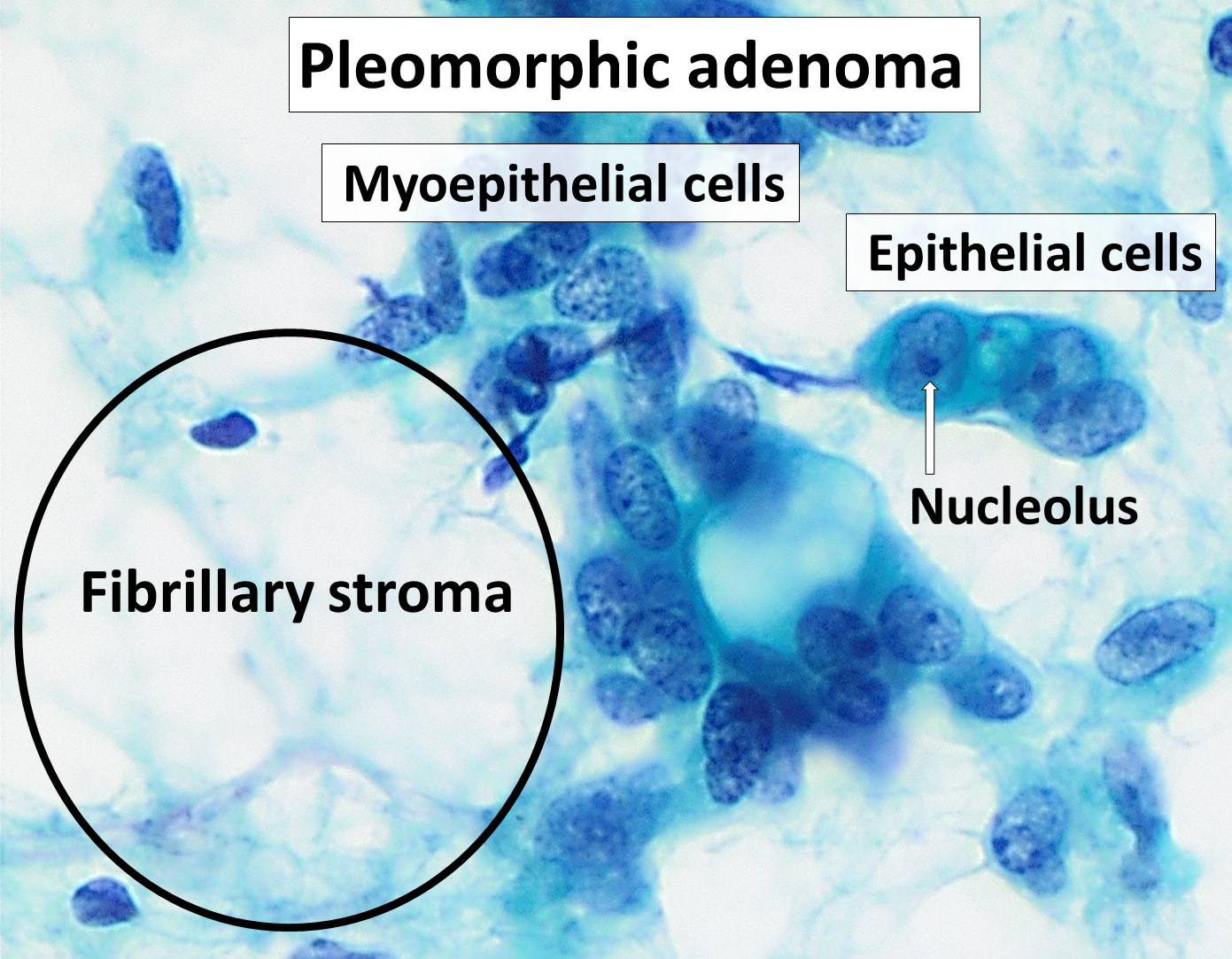
- Cytopathology of pleomorphic adenoma (Pap stain). It can usually be diagnosed by its typical fibrillary stroma (mesenchyme). Stromal cell nuclei are small. Myoepithelial cells are usually the predominant cell type, and their nuclei can have various shapes but are usually more elongated than in epithelial cells. Epithelial cell nuclei may have prominent nucleoli.
- Specialty: Oncology

Pleomorphic adenoma (or benign mixed tumor, Chondromyxohemangioendotheliosarcoma) is a common benign salivary gland neoplasm characterised by neoplastic proliferation of epithelial (ductal) cells along with myoepithelial components, having a malignant potentiality. It is the most common type of salivary gland tumor and the most common tumor of the parotid gland. It derives its name from the architectural Pleomorphism (variable appearance) seen by light microscopy. It is also known as "Mixed tumor, salivary gland type", which refers to its dual origin from epithelial and myoepithelial elements as opposed to its pleomorphic appearance.

== Clinical presentation ==
The tumor is usually solitary and presents as a slow growing, painless, firm single nodular mass. Isolated nodules are generally outgrowths of the main nodule rather than a multinodular presentation. It is usually mobile unless found in the palate and can cause atrophy of the mandibular ramus when located in the parotid gland. When found in the parotid tail, it may present as an eversion of the ear lobe. Though it is classified as a benign tumor, pleomorphic adenomas have the capacity to grow to large proportions and may undergo malignant transformation, to form carcinoma ex-pleomorphic adenoma, a risk that increases with time (9.5% chance to convert into malignancy in 15 years). Although it is "benign", the tumor is aneuploid, it can recur after resection, it invades normal adjacent tissue, and distant metastases have been reported after long (+10 years) time intervals. This tumour most often presents in the lower pole of the superficial lobe of the gland, about 10% of the tumours arise in the deeper portions of the gland. It occurs more frequently in females than in males, the ratio approximating 6:4. The majority of the lesion are found in patients in the fourth to sixth decades with an average age of occurrences of about 43 years, but these are relatively common in young adults and have been known to occur in children.

== Histology ==
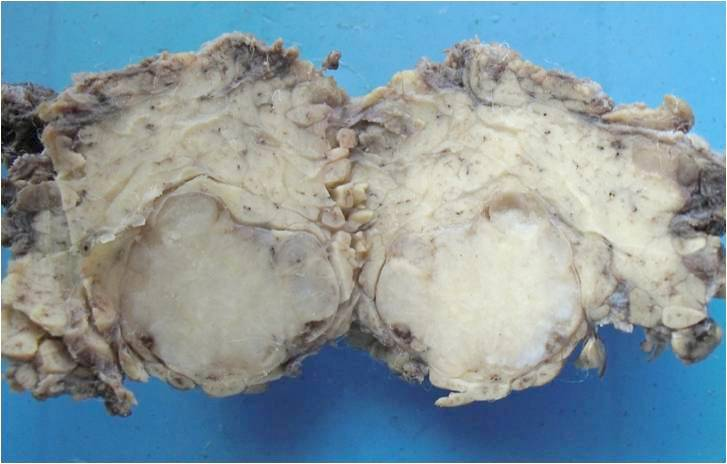
Sialadenectomy specimen showing a well outlined solid neoplasm with cartilaginous areas.

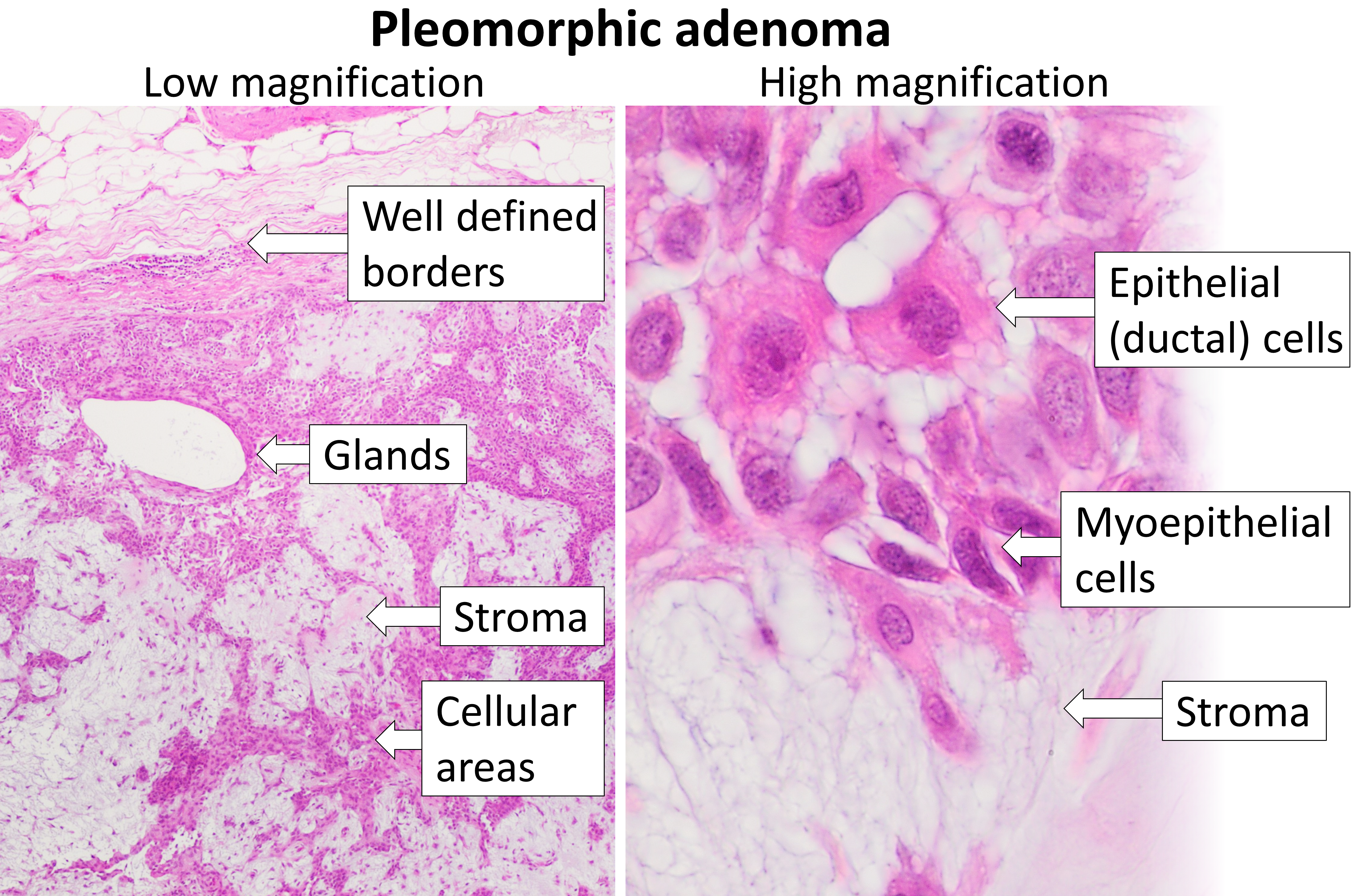
Histopathology of pleomorphic adenoma (H&E stain). The stromal (also called mesenchymal) component often exhibits myxofibrous appearance and in some instances shows chondromatous differentiation.

Morphological diversity is the most characteristic feature of this neoplasm. Histologically, it is highly variable in appearance, even within individual tumors. Classically it is biphasic and is characterized by an admixture of polygonal epithelial and spindle-shaped myoepithelial elements in a variable background stroma that may be mucoid, myxoid, cartilaginous or hyaline. Epithelial elements may be arranged in duct-like structures, sheets, clumps and/or interlacing strands and consist of polygonal, spindle or stellate-shaped cells (hence pleiomorphism). Areas of squamous metaplasia and epithelial pearls may be present. The tumor is not enveloped, but it is surrounded by a fibrous pseudocapsule of varying thickness. The tumor extends through normal glandular parenchyma in the form of finger-like pseudopodia, but this is not a sign of malignant transformation.

The tumor often displays characteristic chromosomal translocations between chromosomes #3 and #8. This causes the PLAG gene to be juxtaposed to the gene for beta catenin. This activates the catenin pathway and leads to inappropriate cell division.

== Diagnosis ==
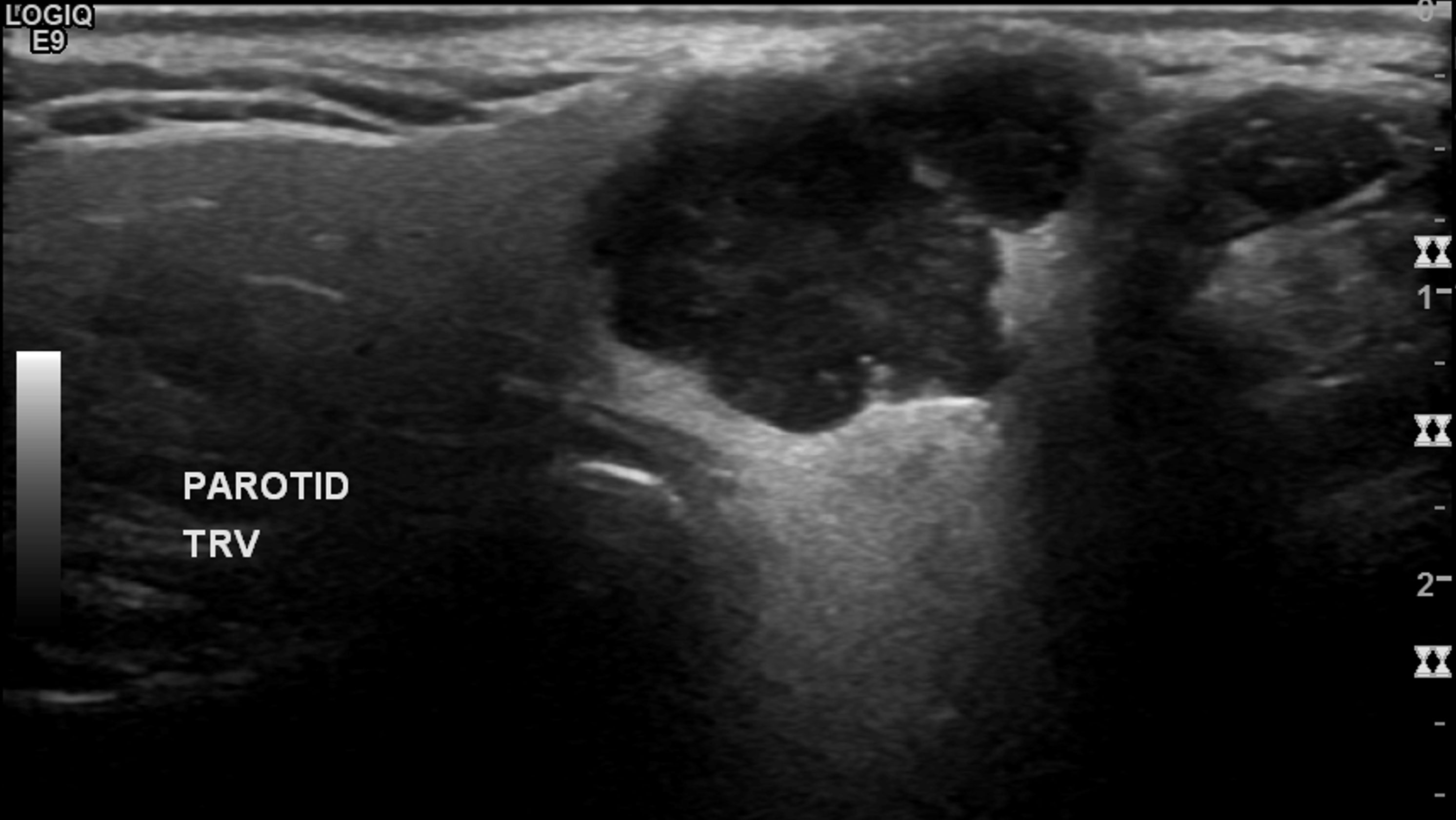
Pleomorphic adenoma in ultrasound

The diagnosis of salivary gland tumors utilize both tissue sampling and radiographic studies. Tissue sampling procedures include fine needle aspiration (FNA) and core needle biopsy (bigger needle comparing to FNA). Both of these procedures can be done in an outpatient setting. Diagnostic imaging techniques for salivary gland tumors include ultrasound, computer tomography (CT) and magnetic resonance imaging (MRI).

Fine needle aspiration biopsy (FNA), operated in experienced hands, can determine whether the tumor is malignant in nature with sensitivity around 90%. FNA can also distinguish primary salivary tumor from metastatic disease.

Core needle biopsy can also be done in outpatient setting. It is more invasive but is more accurate compared to FNA with diagnostic accuracy greater than 97%. Furthermore, core needle biopsy allows more accurate histological typing of the tumor.

In terms of imaging studies, ultrasound can determine and characterize superficial parotid tumors. Certain types of salivary gland tumors have certain sonographic characteristics on ultrasound. Ultrasound is also frequently used to guide FNA or core needle biopsy.

CT allows direct, bilateral visualization of the salivary gland tumor and provides information about overall dimension and tissue invasion. CT is excellent for demonstrating bony invasion. MRI provides superior soft tissue delineation such as perineural invasion when compared to CT only.

== Treatment ==
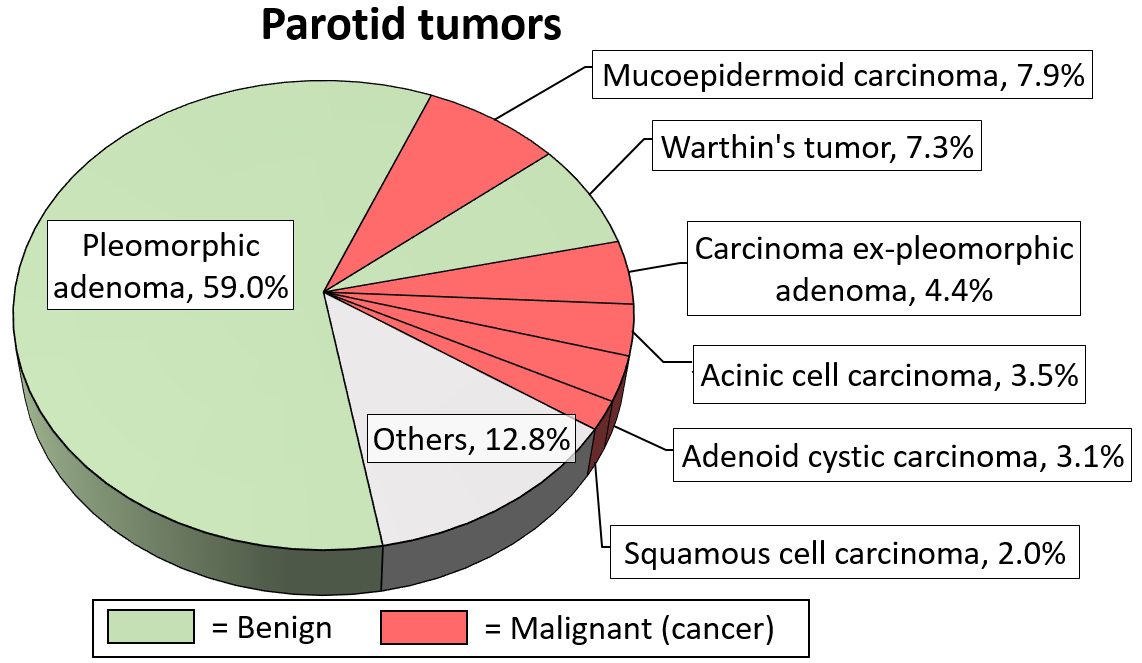
Relative incidence of parotid tumors, showing pleomorphic adenoma being a majority of tumors.

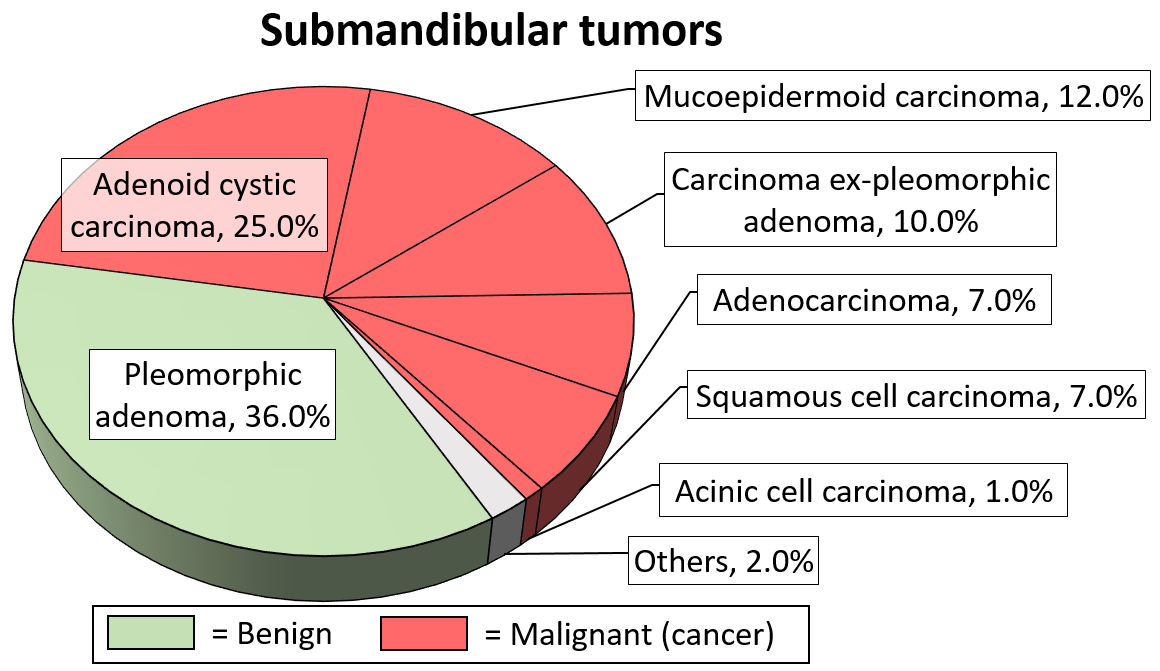
Relative incidence of submandibular tumors, with pleomorphic adenoma being the most common.

Overall, the mainstay of the treatment for salivary gland tumor is surgical resection. Needle biopsy is highly recommended prior to surgery to confirm the diagnosis. More detailed surgical technique and the support for additional adjuvant radiotherapy depends on whether the tumor is malignant or benign.

Surgical treatment of parotid gland tumors is sometimes difficult, partly because of the anatomical relationship of the facial nerve and the parotid lodge, but also through the increased potential for postoperative relapse. Thus, detection of early stages of a tumor of the parotid gland is extremely important in terms of prognosis after surgery.

There have been several approaches for surgery of parotid pleomorphic adenoma in the course of time. Enucleation of the tumor (i.e. intracapsular dissection), a procedure that was common in the early 20th century, is nowadays obsolete due to very high incidence of recurrence. After the time of enucleations, pleomorphic adenomas of parotid gland were recommended to be routinely treated with superficial or total parotidectomy. These procedures combine complete tumor removal and identification of the main trunk of facial nerve during surgery to avoid any lesions to the nerve. However, extensive surgery may cause significant morbidity, such as Frey´s syndrome (excessive sweat while eating) and salivary fistula. Also, aesthetic outcome may be compromised. Therefore, less invasive procedures have been preferred in selected cases during the recent years, and introduction of perioperative neuromonitoring enabled the evolution of several different surgical techniques some twenty years ago.

Currently, the choice of surgical approach for parotid pleomorphic adenoma is mainly based on the size, location, and mobility of the tumor. The recommended main techniques include extracapsular dissection, partial superficial parotidectomy, and lateral or total parotidectomy. Nevertheless, the experience of surgeon plays a key role in the results of these distinct procedures. An important point of view is that recurrent pleomorphic adenomas may occur after a very long time from primary surgery, on average over 7–10 years but up to 24 years afterwards. Thus, it is of utmost importance to evaluate the ultimate results of these different surgical techniques in the future.

The benign tumors of the submandibular gland is treated by simple excision with preservation of mandibular branch of the facial nerve, the hypoglossal nerve, and the lingual nerve. Other benign tumors of minor salivary glands are treated similarly.

Malignant salivary tumors usually require wide local resection of the primary tumor. However, if complete resection cannot be achieved, adjuvant radiotherapy should be added to improve local control. This surgical treatment has many sequelae such as cranial nerve damage, Frey's syndrome, cosmetic problems, etc.

Usually about 44% of the patients have a complete histologic removal of the tumor and this refers to the most significant survival rate.

== See also ==
- Warthin's tumor - monomorphic adenoma
- Carcinoma
- Sialadenitis
