= Inverted papilloma =

- Other names: Ringertz tumor
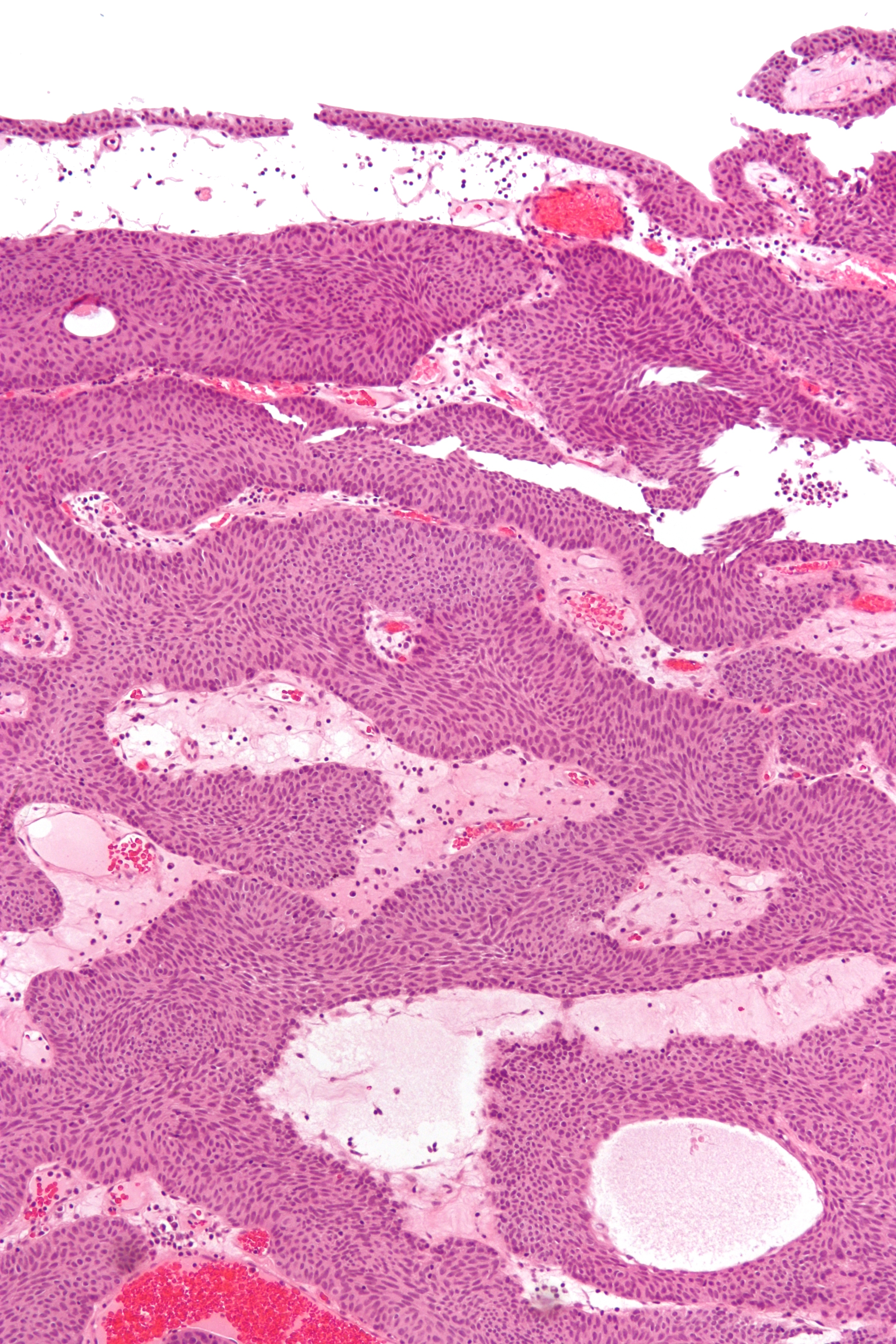
- Micrograph of an inverted papilloma of the urinary bladder; H&E stained
- Specialty: Oncology

An inverted papilloma, also known as Ringertz tumor, is a type of tumor in which surface epithelial cells grow downward into the underlying supportive tissue. It may occur in the nose and/or sinuses or in the urinary tract (bladder, renal pelvis, ureter, urethra). When it occurs in the nose or sinuses, it may cause symptoms similar to those caused by sinusitis, such as nasal congestion. When it occurs in the urinary tract, it may cause blood in the urine.

== Diagnosis ==
Inverted papillomas are definitively diagnosed by histologic examination. However, magnetic resonance imaging (MRI) may show a characteristic feature described as a convoluted cerebriform pattern (CCP). A retrospective study published in the American Journal of Neuroradiology concluded that identification of CCP by MRI in a patient with a nasal tumor made the diagnosis of Inverted papilloma quite likely. The study reported the sensitivity and specificity to be 100% and 87% respectively. CCP can be associated with other malignant tumors as well.

== Treatment ==
The treatment of choice in sinus and nose is by Functional endoscopic sinus surgery.

== Recurrence and malignification ==
Inverted papillomas of the sinus and nose have a high risk of recurrence after surgical treatment. The recurrence often occurs within 2 years after the surgery and at the initial anatomical site . Inverted papillomas have a potential for malignant transformation in 5-15%.

== History ==
Inverted papillomas were first described by Nils Ringertz in 1938. He reported their microscopic appearance and their tendency to grow into the connective tissue stroma.

== Additional image ==
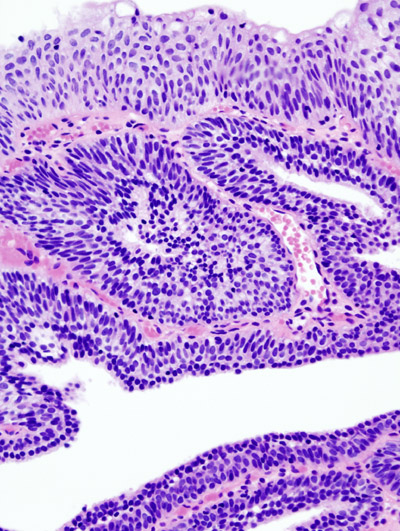
Histopathology representing an inverted papilloma of the urinary bladder that was cystoscopically resected. Hematoxylin and eosion stain.

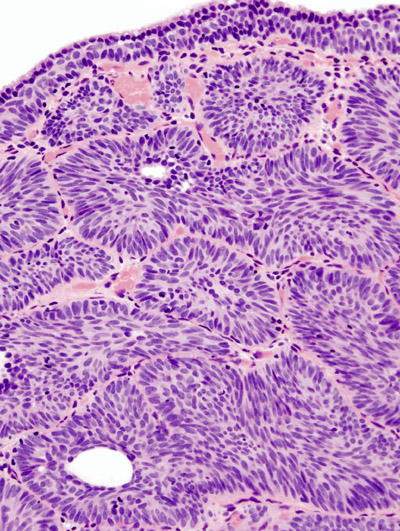
Histopathology representing an inverted papilloma of the urinary bladder that was cystoscopically resected. Hematoxylin and eosion stain.

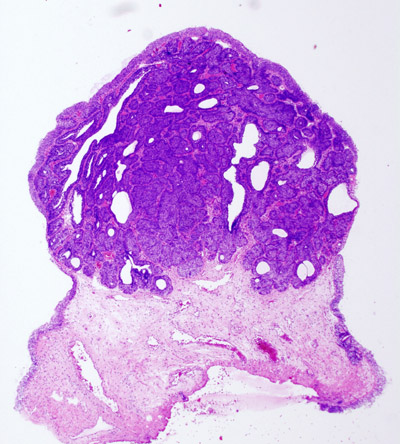
Histopathology representing an inverted papilloma of the urinary bladder that was cystoscopically resected. Hematoxylin and eosion stain.

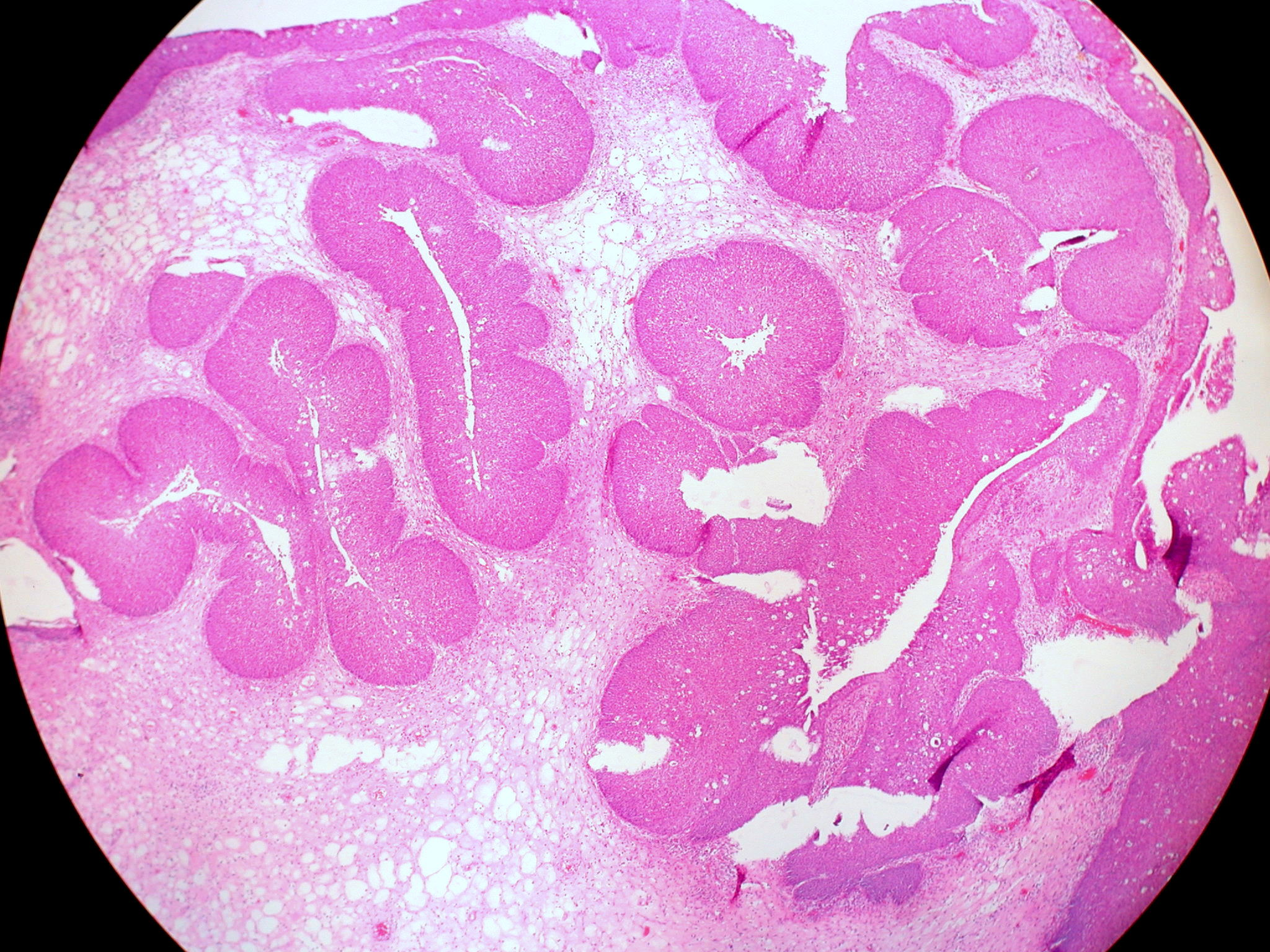
Inverted Schneiderian Papilloma of the Nasal Cavity.

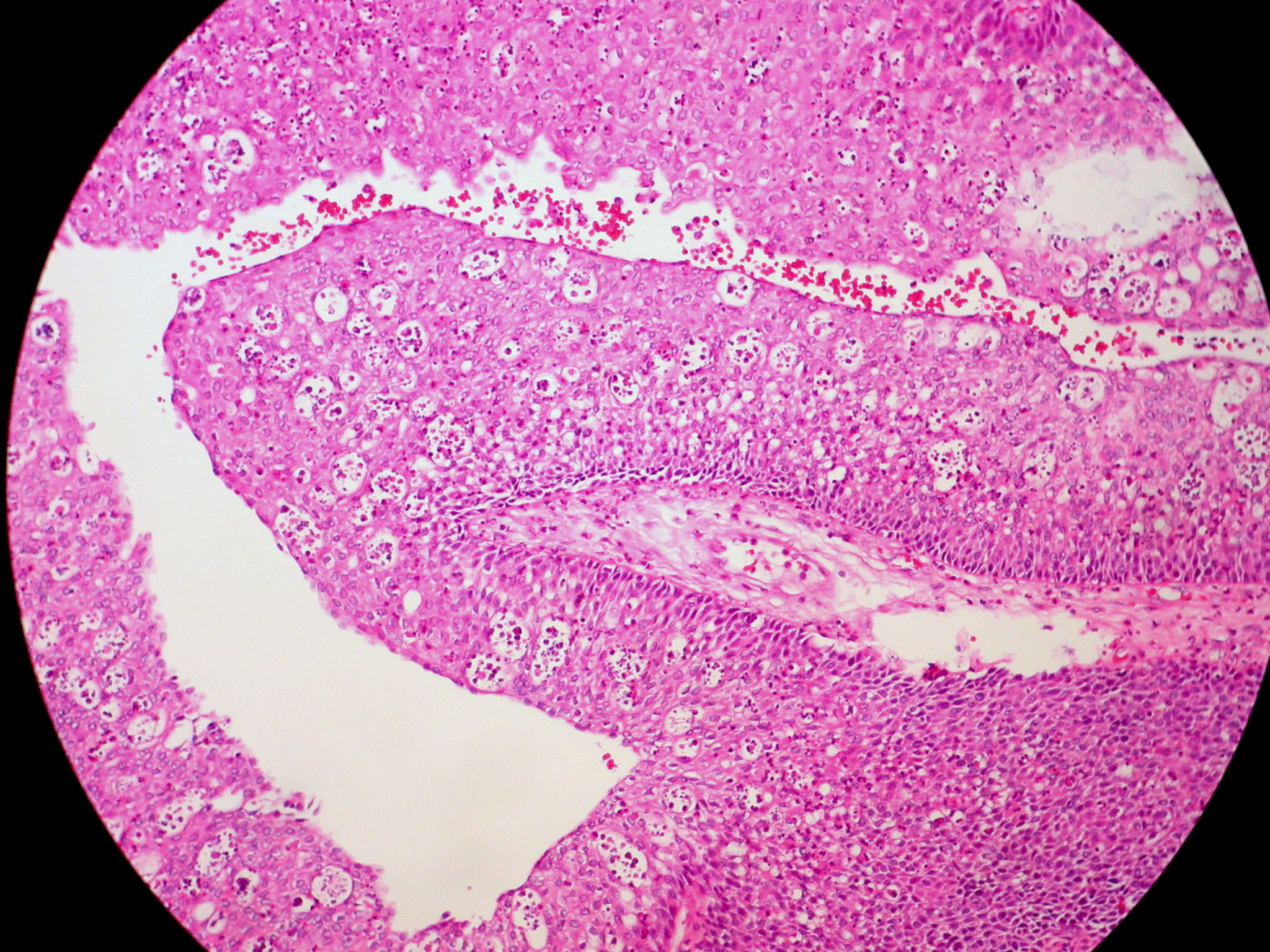
Inverted Schneiderian Papilloma of the Nasal Cavity with Abundant intraepithelial microabscesses.
