= List of cancer types =

Cancer
- Specialty: Oncology

Cancer death rates by type

The following is a list of cancer types. Cancer is a group of diseases that involve abnormal increases in the number of cells, with the potential to invade or spread to other parts of the body. Not all tumors or lumps are cancerous; benign tumors are not classified as being cancer because they do not spread to other parts of the body. There are over 200 different known cancers that affect humans.

Cancers are often described by the body part that they originated in. However, some body parts contain multiple types of tissue, so for greater precision, cancers are additionally classified by the type of cell that the tumor cells originated from. These types include:

- Carcinoma: Cancers derived from epithelial cells. This group includes many of the most common cancers that occur in older adults. Nearly all cancers developing in the breast, prostate, lung, pancreas, and colon are carcinomas.
- Sarcoma: Cancers arising from connective tissue (i.e. bone, cartilage, fat, nerve), each of which develop from cells originating in mesenchymal cells outside of the bone marrow.
- Lymphoma and leukemia: These two classes of cancer arise from immature cells that originate in the bone marrow, and are intended to fully differentiate and mature into normal components of the immune system and the blood, respectively. Acute lymphoblastic leukemia is the most common type of cancer in children, accounting for ~30% of cases. However, far more adults than children develop lymphoma and leukemia.
- Germ cell tumor: Cancers derived from pluripotent cells, most often presenting in the testicle or the ovary (seminoma and dysgerminoma, respectively).
- Blastoma: Cancers derived from immature "precursor" cells or embryonic tissue. Blastomas are generally more common in children (e.g. neuroblastoma, retinoblastoma, nephroblastoma, hepatoblastoma, medulloblastoma, etc.) than in older adults.

Cancers are usually named using -carcinoma, -sarcoma or -blastoma as a suffix, with the Latin or Greek word for the organ or tissue of origin as the root. For example, the most common cancer of the liver parenchyma ("hepato-" = liver), arising from malignant epithelial cells ("carcinoma"), would be called a hepatocarcinoma, while a malignancy arising from primitive liver precursor cells is called a hepatoblastoma. Similarly, a cancer arising from malignant fat cells would be termed a liposarcoma.

For some common cancers, the English organ name is used. For example, the most common type of breast cancer is called ductal carcinoma of the breast.

Benign tumors (which are not cancers) are usually named using -oma as a suffix with the organ name as the root. For example, a benign tumor of smooth muscle cells is called a leiomyoma (the common name of this frequently occurring benign tumor in the uterus is fibroid). Confusingly, some types of cancer use the -noma suffix, examples including melanoma and seminoma.

Some types of cancer are named for the size and shape of the cells under a microscope, such as giant cell carcinoma, spindle cell carcinoma, and small-cell carcinoma.

== Bone and muscle sarcoma ==
- Adamantinoma
- Chondrosarcoma
- Chordoma
- Ewing's sarcoma
- Fibrocartilaginous mesenchymoma of bone
- Leiomyosarcoma
- Malignant fibrous histiocytoma of bone/osteosarcoma
- Myxosarcoma
- Osteosarcoma
- Rhabdomyosarcoma

== Brain and nervous system ==
- Astrocytoma
- Anaplastic astrocytoma
- Brainstem glioma
- Choroid plexus carcinoma
- Craniopharyngioma
- Ependymoma
- Ganglioneuroma
- Glioblastoma
- Glioma
- Hemangioblastoma
- Medulloblastoma
- Meningioma
- Neuroblastoma
- Neurofibroma
- Oligodendroglioma
- Paraganglioma
- Pineal astrocytoma
- Pineocytoma
- Pineoblastoma
- Pituitary adenoma
- Pilocytic astrocytoma
- Primary central nervous system lymphoma
- Primitive neuroectodermal tumor
- Schwannoma
- Visual pathway and hypothalamic glioma

== Breast ==
- Breast cancer
- Ductal carcinoma in situ
- Inflammatory breast cancer
- Invasive ductal carcinoma
- Invasive lobular carcinoma
- Tubular carcinoma
- Invasive cribriform carcinoma of the breast (also termed invasive cribriform carcinoma)
- Medullary carcinoma
- Male breast cancer
- Phyllodes tumor
- Mammary secretory carcinoma
- Mucinous carcinoma of the breast
- Papillary carcinomas of the breast

== Endocrine system ==
- Adrenocortical adenoma
- Adrenocortical carcinoma
- Carcinoid
- Gastrinoma
- Glucagonoma
- Insulinoma
- Islet cell carcinoma (endocrine pancreas)
- Merkel cell carcinoma
- Multiple endocrine neoplasia syndrome
- Pancreatic cancer
- Parathyroid cancer
- Pheochromocytoma
- Somatostatinoma
- Thyroid cancer
- VIPoma

== Eye ==
- Conjunctival melanoma
- Optic nerve glioma
- Orbital lymphoma
- Retinoblastoma
- Uveal melanoma

== Gastrointestinal ==
- Anal cancer
- Appendix cancer
- Cholangiocarcinoma
- Carcinoid tumor, gastrointestinal
- Colon cancer
- Duodenal cancer
- Gallbladder cancer
- Gastric (stomach) cancer
- Gastrointestinal carcinoid tumor
- Gastrointestinal stromal tumor (GIST)
- Liver cancer
- Pancreatic cancer, islet cell
- Rectal cancer
- Small intestine cancer

== Genitourinary and Gynecologic ==
- Bladder cancer
- Cervical cancer
- Choriocarcinoma
- Embryonal carcinoma
- Endometrial cancer
- Endodermal sinus tumor
- Extragonadal germ cell tumor
- Fallopian tube cancer
- Gestational trophoblastic tumor
- Kidney cancer
- Leydig cell tumour
- Ovarian cancer
- Ovarian epithelial cancer (surface epithelial-stromal tumor)
- Ovarian germ cell tumor
- Penile cancer
- Prostate cancer
- Renal cell carcinoma
- Renal pelvis and ureter, transitional cell cancer*
- Seminoma
- Serous tumour
- Sertoli cell tumour
- Teratoma
- Testicular cancer
- Transitional cell cancer (urothelial carcinoma)
- Urethral cancer
- Uterine sarcoma
- Vaginal cancer
- Vulvar cancer
- Wilms tumor (nephroblastoma)
- Malignant Oncocytoma (Katie Coleman Tumor)

== Head and neck ==
- Esophageal cancer
- Head and neck cancer
- Nasopharyngeal carcinoma
- Oral cancer
- Oropharyngeal cancer
- Paranasal sinus and nasal cavity cancer
- Pharyngeal cancer
- Salivary gland cancer
- Hypopharyngeal cancer

== Hematopoietic ==
- Acute biphenotypic leukemia
- Acute eosinophilic leukemia
- Acute lymphoblastic leukemia
- Acute myeloid leukemia
- Acute myeloid dendritic cell leukemia
- AIDS-related lymphoma
- Anaplastic large cell lymphoma
- Angioimmunoblastic T-cell lymphoma
- B-cell prolymphocytic leukemia
- Burkitt's lymphoma
- Chronic lymphocytic leukemia
- Chronic myelogenous leukemia
- Cutaneous T-cell lymphoma
- Diffuse large B-cell lymphoma
- Follicular lymphoma
- Hairy cell leukemia
- Hepatosplenic T-cell lymphoma
- Hodgkin's lymphoma
- Intravascular large B-cell lymphoma
- Large granular lymphocytic leukemia
- Lymphoplasmacytic lymphoma
- Lymphomatoid granulomatosis
- Mantle cell lymphoma
- Marginal zone B-cell lymphoma
- Mast cell leukemia
- Mediastinal large B cell lymphoma
- Multiple myeloma/plasma cell neoplasm
- Myelodysplastic syndromes
- Mucosa-associated lymphoid tissue lymphoma
- Mycosis fungoides
- Nodal marginal zone B cell lymphoma
- Non-Hodgkin lymphoma
- Precursor B lymphoblastic leukemia
- Primary central nervous system lymphoma
- Primary cutaneous follicular lymphoma
- Primary cutaneous immunocytoma
- Primary effusion lymphoma
- Plasmablastic lymphoma
- Sézary syndrome
- Splenic marginal zone lymphoma
- T-cell prolymphocytic leukemia

== Skin ==
- Basal cell carcinoma
- Squamous cell carcinoma
- Squamous cell skin cancer
- Skin adnexal tumors (e.g. sebaceous carcinoma)
- Melanoma
- Merkel cell carcinoma
- Keratoacanthoma
- Sarcomas of primary cutaneous origin (e.g. dermatofibrosarcoma protuberans)
- Lymphomas of primary cutaneous origin (e.g. mycosis fungoides)

== Soft Tissue Sarcoma ==
- Angiosarcoma
- Fibrosarcoma
- Liposarcoma
- Malignant peripheral nerve sheath tumor
- Synovial sarcoma
- Blastoma

== Thoracic and Respiratory ==
- Adenocarcinoma of the lung
- Basaloid squamous cell lung carcinoma
- Bronchial adenomas/carcinoids
- Giant-cell carcinoma of the lung
- Large-cell lung carcinoma
- Large cell lung carcinoma with rhabdoid phenotype
- Laryngeal cancer
- Mesothelioma
- Non-small cell lung cancer
- Non-small cell lung carcinoma
- Pleuropulmonary blastoma
- Sarcomatoid carcinoma of the lung
- Small cell lung cancer
- Squamous-cell carcinoma of the lung
- Thymoma and thymic carcinoma

== cancers main in this using this processAIDS-related cancers ==
- Kaposi sarcoma

== Nonspecific types ==
- Epithelioid hemangioendothelioma (EHE)
- Desmoplastic small round cell tumor

== See also ==
- Lists of diseases
- List of oncology-related terms
