= Combined small-cell lung carcinoma =

Combined Small Cell Lung Carcinoma
- Other names: Combined small cell and nonsmall cell lung carcinoma; mixed small cell-large cell carcinoma, combined "oat cell" carcinoma (obsolete)
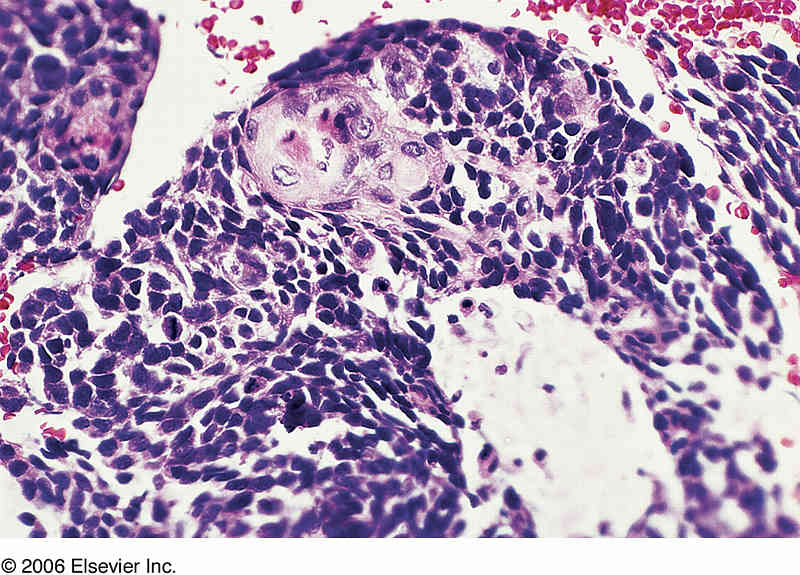
- Combined small cell lung carcinoma containing a component of squamous cell carcinoma
- Specialty: Oncology

Combined small cell lung carcinoma (or c-SCLC) is a form of multiphasic lung cancer that is diagnosed by a pathologist when a malignant tumor, arising from transformed cells originating in lung tissue, contains a component of small cell lung carcinoma (SCLC) mixed with one or more components of any histological variant of non-small cell lung carcinoma (NSCLC) in any relative proportion.

In order to ensure that patients receive the proper treatment, it is critical that the pathologist, when making a diagnosis of lung cancer, reports the finding of small cell carcinoma, regardless of other components, because small cell carcinoma is considered the most aggressive of all the lung cancer variants, and its treatment is normally radically different than the other forms of lung cancer (see below).

For epidemiological and statistical purposes, combined small cell carcinoma of the lung has been long classified as a subset of small cell carcinoma, and not as a subset of the other component carcinoma in the sample.

== Classification ==
Lung cancer is a large and exceptionally heterogeneous family of malignancies. Over 50 different histological variants are explicitly recognized within the 2004 revision of the World Health Organization (WHO) typing system ("WHO-2004"), currently the most widely used lung cancer classification scheme. Many of these entities are rare, recently described, and poorly understood. However, since different forms of malignant tumors generally exhibit diverse genetic, biological, and clinical properties — including response to treatment — accurate classification of lung cancer cases are critical to assuring that patients with lung cancer receive optimum management.

Approximately 99% of lung cancers are carcinoma, a term that indicates that the malignant neoplasm is composed of, or descended from, cells of epithelial lineage (i.e. derived from embryonic endoderm, as is the case in lung carcinomas, or from ectoderm), and/or that the malignant cells exhibit tissue architectural, cytological, or molecular features characteristically found in epithelial cells. Under WHO-2004, lung carcinomas are divided into 8 major taxa:

- Squamous cell carcinoma
- Small cell carcinoma
- Adenocarcinoma
- Large cell carcinoma
- Adenosquamous carcinoma
- Sarcomatoid carcinoma
- Carcinoid tumor
- Salivary gland-like carcinoma

SCLC is generally considered to be the most aggressive of these major forms of lung cancer, with the worst long term prognosis and survival rates. As a result, it is recommended that all multiphasic malignant lung tumors (i.e. those with more than one histological pattern) that are found to contain any proportion of SCLC cells should be classified as c-SCLC, and not as combined forms of any of the other histological variants present in the tumor. Currently, the only exception to this recommendation occurs in cases where anaplastic large cell lung carcinoma (LCLC) is the second histological component. In these instances, a minimum of 10% of the viable malignant cells present must be identified as LCLC before the tumor is considered to be a c-SCLC. Under the WHO-2004 classification scheme, c-SCLC is the only recognized variant of SCLC.

== Histogenesis ==
The exact mechanisms and histogenesis of lung cancers are topics of intense interest and research. It is currently thought that most cases of lung cancer probably occur after damage to genomic DNA causes malignant transformation of a single multipotent cell. This newly formed entity, sometimes referred to as a cancer stem cell, then begins to divide uncontrollably, giving rise to new daughter cancer cells in an exponential (or near exponential) fashion. Unless this runaway cell division process is checked, a clinically apparent tumor will eventually form as the mass reaches sufficient size to be detected clinically, or begins to cause signs or symptoms. Approximately 98% of lung cancers are eventually diagnosed as a histological variant of carcinoma, a term that signifies that the tumor derives from transformed epithelial cells, or cells that have acquired epithelial characteristics as a result of cell differentiation.

The histogenesis of c-SCLC and other multiphasic forms of lung cancer appear to be complex and varied phenomena. In most cases of c-SCLC, genomic and immunohistochemical studies suggest that the morphological divergence of the separate components occurs when a SCLC-like cell is transformed into a cell with the potential to develop NSCLC variant characteristics, and not vice versa. Daughter cells of this transdifferentiated SCLC-like cell then repeatedly divide and, under both intrinsic genomic and extrinsic environmental influences, acquire additional mutations (a process known as tumor progression). The result is that the tumor acquires specific cytologic and architectural features suggesting a mixture of SCLC and NSCLC.

Other analyses suggest that, in at least in some cases, more highly differentiated variants of NSCLC (i.e. adenocarcinoma) can "progress" to give rise to areas within the primary (original) tumor (or its metastases) that develop histological and molecular characteristics of SCLC.

Other molecular studies, however, suggest that — in at least a minority of cases — independent development of the components in c-SCLC occurs via mutation and transformation in two different cells in close spatial proximity to each other, due to field cancerization. In these cases, repeated division and mutational progression in both cancer stem cells generate a biclonal "collision tumor".

Regardless of which of these mechanisms give rise to the tumor, recent studies suggest that, in the later stages of c-SCLC oncogenesis, continued mutational progression within each tumor component results in the cells of the combined tumor developing molecular profiles that more closely resemble each other than they do cells of the "pure" forms of the individual morphological variants.

C-SCLC also occurs quite commonly after treatment of "pure" SCLC with chemotherapy and/or radiation, probably as a result of a combination of tumor genome-specific "progressional" mutations, stochastic genomic phenomena, and additional mutations induced by the cytotoxic therapy.

The most common forms of NSCLC identified as components within c-SCLC are large cell carcinoma, adenocarcinoma, and squamous cell carcinoma. Rarer variants of NSCLC are seen less commonly, such as combinations with carcinoids, spindle cell carcinoma, and giant cell carcinoma. Giant cell carcinoma components are seen much more commonly in patients who have undergone radiation.

== Staging ==
Staging of c-SCLC patients is usually performed in an analogous fashion to patients with "pure" small cell lung carcinoma.

For several decades, SCLC has been staged according to a dichotomous distinction of "limited disease" (LD) vs. "extensive disease" (ED) tumor burdens. Nearly all clinical trials have been conducted on SCLC patients staged dichotomously in this fashion. LD is roughly defined as a locoregional tumor burden confined to one hemithorax that can be encompassed within a single, tolerable radiation field, and without detectable distant metastases beyond the chest or supraclavicular lymph nodes. A patient is assigned an ED stage when the tumor burden is greater than that defined under LD criteria — either far advanced locoregional disease, malignant effusions from the pleura or pericardium, or distant metastases.

However, more recent data reviewing outcomes in very large numbers of SCLC patients suggests that the TNM staging system used for NSCLC is also reliable and valid when applied to SCLC patients, and that more current versions may allow better treatment decisionmaking and prognostication in SCLC than with the old dichotomous staging protocol.

== Treatment ==
A very large number of clinical trials have been conducted in "pure" SCLC over the past several decades. As a result, evidence-based sets of guidelines for treating monophasic SCLC are available. While the current set of SCLC treatment guidelines recommend that c-SCLC be treated in the same manner as "pure" SCLC, they also note that the evidence supporting their recommendation is quite weak. It is likely, then, that the optimum treatment for patients with c-SCLC remains unknown.

The current generally accepted standard of care for all forms of SCLC is concurrent chemotherapy (CT) and thoracic radiation therapy (TRT) in LD, and CT only in ED. For complete responders (patients in whom all evidence of disease disappears), prophylactic cranial irradiation (PCI) is also given. TRT serves to increase the probability of total eradication of residual locoregional disease, while PCI aims to eliminate any micrometastases to the brain.

Surgery is not often considered as a treatment option in SCLC (including c-SCLC) due to the high probability of distant metastases at the time of diagnosis. This paradigm was driven by early studies showing that the administration of systemic therapies resulted in improved survival as compared to patients undergoing surgical resection. Recent studies, however, have suggested that surgery for highly selected, very early-stage c-SCLC patients may indeed improve outcomes. Other experts recommend resection for residual masses of NSCLC components after complete local tumor response to chemotherapy and/or radiotherapy in c-SCLC.

Although other combinations of drugs have occasionally been shown to be noninferior at various endpoints and in some subgroups of patients, the combination of cisplatin or carboplatin plus etoposide or irinotecan are considered comparable first-line regimens for SCLC. For patients who do not respond to first line therapy, or who relapse after complete remission, topotecan is the only agent which has been definitively shown to offer increased survival over best supportive care (BSC), although in Japan amrubicin is considered effective as salvage therapy.

Importantly, c-SCLC is usually much more resistant to CT and RT than "pure" SCLC. While the mechanisms for this increased resistance of c-SCLC to conventional cytotoxic treatments highly active in "pure" SCLC remain mostly unknown, recent studies suggest that the earlier in its biological history that a c-SCLC is treated, the more likely it is to resemble "pure" SCLC in its response to CT and RT.

=== Targeted agents ===
In recent years, several new types of "molecularly targeted" agents have been developed and used to treat lung cancer. While a very large number of agents targeting various molecular pathways are being developed and tested, the main classes and agents that are now being used in lung cancer treatment include:

- Epidermal growth factor receptor (EGFR) tyrosine kinase inhibitors (TKIs):
  - Erlotinib (Tarceva)
  - Gefitinib (Iressa)
  - Cetuximab (Erbitux)
- Inhibitors of vascular endothelial growth factor (VEGF)
  - Bevacizumab (Avastin)
- Inhibitors of folate metabolism
  - Pemetrexed (Alimta)

To date, most clinical trials of targeted agents, alone and in combination with previously tested treatment regimens, have either been ineffective in SCLC or no more effective than standard platinum-based doublets. While there have been no randomized clinical trials of targeted agents in c-SCLC, some small case series suggest that some may be useful in c-SCLC. Many targeted agents appear more active in certain NSCLC variants. Given that c-SCLC contains components of NSCLC, and that the chemoradioresistance of NSCLC components impact the effectiveness of c-SCLC treatment, these agents may permit the design of more rational treatment regimens for c-SCLC.

EGFR-TKI's have been found to be active against variants exhibiting certain mutations in the EGFR gene. While EGFR mutations are very rare (<5%) in "pure" SCLC, they are considerably more common (about 15–20%) in c-SCLC, particularly in non-smoking females whose c-SCLC tumors contain an adenocarcinoma component. These patients are much more likely to have classical EGFR mutations in the small cell component of their tumors as well, and their tumors seem to be more likely to respond to treatment with EGFR-TKI's. EGFR-targeted agents appear particularly effective in papillary adenocarcinoma, non-mucinous bronchioloalveolar carcinoma, and adenocarcinoma with mixed subtypes.

The role of VEGF inhibition and bevacizumab in treating SCLC remains unknown. Some studies suggest it may, when combined with other agents, improve some measures of survival in SCLC patients and in some non-squamous cell variants of NSCLC.

Pemetrexed has been shown to improve survival in non-squamous cell NSCLC, and is the first drug to reveal differential survival benefit in large cell lung carcinoma.

C-SCLC appear to express female hormone (i.e. estrogen and/or progesterone) receptors in a high (50–67%) proportion of cases, similar to breast carcinomas.

== Prognosis ==
Current consensus is that the long-term prognosis of c-SCLC patients is determined by the SCLC component of their tumor, given that "pure" SCLC seems to have the worst long-term prognosis of all forms of lung cancer. Although data on c-SCLC is very sparse, some studies suggest that survival rates in c-SCLC may be even worse than that of pure SCLC, likely due to the lower rate of complete response to chemoradiation in c-SCLC, although not all studies have shown a significant difference in survival.

Untreated "pure" SCLC patients have a median survival time of between 4 weeks and 4 months, depending on stage and performance status at the time of diagnosis.

Given proper multimodality treatment, SCLC patients with limited disease have median survival rates of between 16 and 24 months, and about 20% will be cured. In patients with extensive disease SCLC, although 60% to 70% will have good-to-complete responses to treatment, very few will be cured, with a median survival of only 6 to 10 months.

Some evidence suggests that c-SCLC patients who continue to smoke may have much worse outcomes after treatment than those who quit.

== Incidence ==
Reliable comprehensive incidence statistics for c-SCLC are unavailable. In the literature, the frequency with which the c-SCLC variant is diagnosed largely depends on the size of tumor samples, tending to be higher in series where large surgical resection specimens are examined, and lower when diagnoses are based on small cytology and/or biopsy samples. Tatematsu et al. reported 15 cases of c-SCLC (12%) in their series of 122 consecutive SCLC patients, but only 20 resection specimens were examined. In contrast, Nicholson et al. found 28 c-SCLC (28%) in a series of 100 consecutive resected SCLC cases. It appears likely, then, that the c-SCLC variant comprises 25% to 30% of all SCLC cases.

As the incidence of SCLC has declined somewhat in the U.S. in recent decades, it is likely that c-SCLC has also decreased in incidence. Nevertheless, small cell carcinomas (including the c-SCLC variant) still comprise 15–20% of all lung cancers, with c-SCLC probably accounting for 4–6%. With 220,000 cases of newly diagnosed lung cancer in the U.S. each year, it can be estimated that between 8,800 and 13,200 of these are c-SCLC.

In a study of 408 consecutive patients with SCLC, Quoix and colleagues found that presentation as a solitary pulmonary nodule (SPN) is particularly indicative of a c-SCLC — about 2/3 of their SPN's were pathologically confirmed to be c-SCLC's containing a large cell carcinoma component.

=== Significance ===
In terms of case numbers, the estimated 8,800 to 13,200 c-SCLC cases occurring annually in the U.S. makes this disease roughly comparable in incidence to Hodgkin's Disease (8,500), testicular cancer (8,400), cervical cancer (11,300), and cancers of the larynx (12,300). However, these four "better-known" cancers all have exceptionally high (85%-95%) cure rates. In contrast, less than 10% of c-SCLC patients will be cured, and thus the number of annual cases of c-SCLC is a reasonable approximation of the annual number of deaths. Therefore, given the significant incidence and mortality attributable to this malignancy, (see Prognosis and survival) it is arguably critical to better understand these aggressive lesions so specific strategies for their management can be rationally designed.

However, as patients with tumors containing mixtures of histological subtypes are usually excluded from clinical trials, the properties of multiphasic tumors like c-SCLC are much less well understood than those of monophasic tumors. C-SCLC contains both SCLC and NSCLC by definition, and since patients with SCLC and NSCLC are usually treated differently, the lack of good data on c-SCLC means there is little evidence available with which to form consensus about whether c-SCLC should be treated like SCLC, NSCLC, or uniquely.
