= Giant-cell carcinoma of the lung =

Giant cell carcinoma of the lung
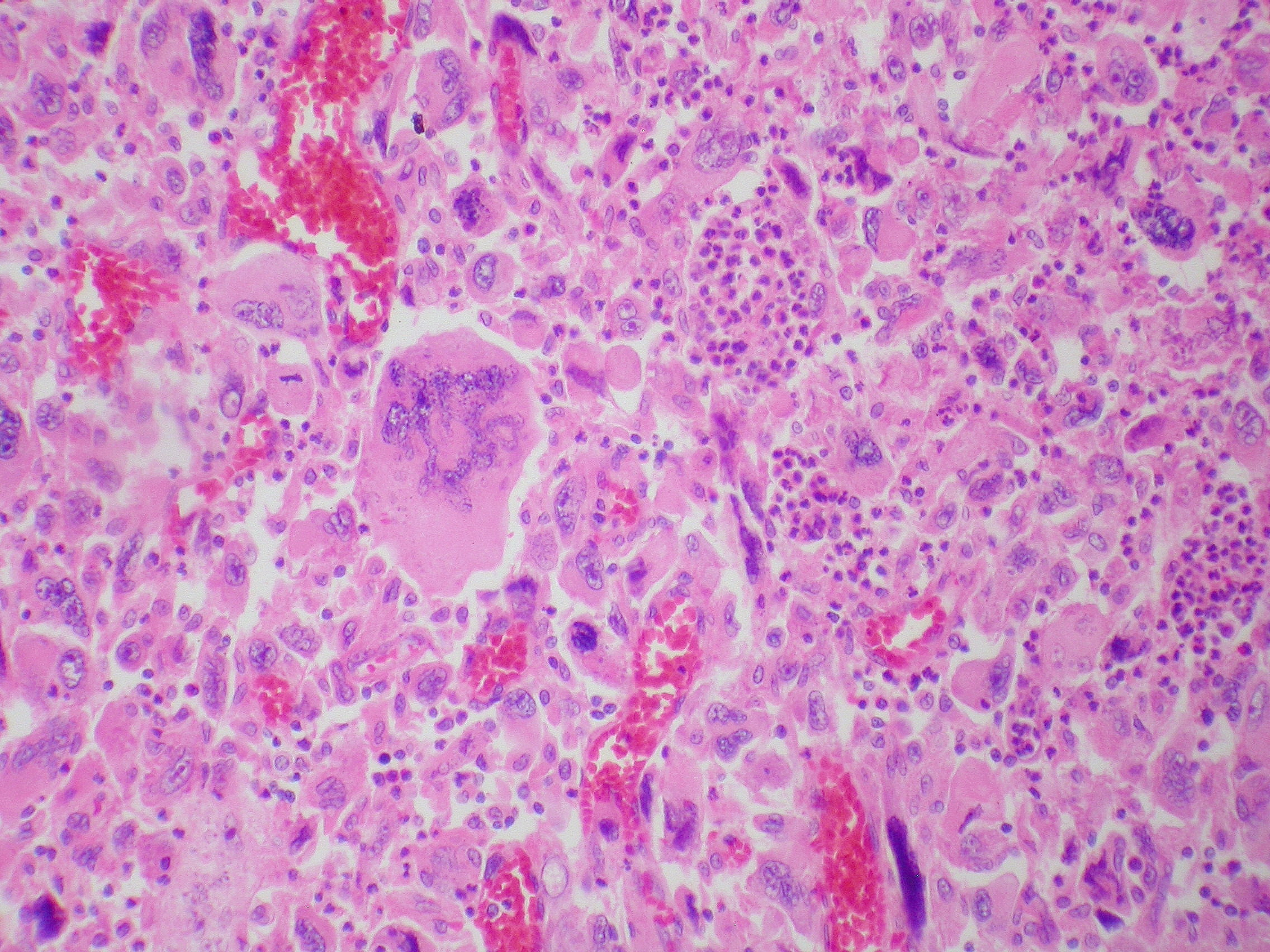
- Pulmonary giant cell carcinoma represents a rare variety of non-small cell lung carcinoma that is characterized by the presence of numerous tumor giant cells and an influx of inflammatory cells that are mostly polymorphonuclear leukocytes admixed with macrophages. The dense oval aggregates of polymorphonuclear leukocytes seen in this image are probably located in the cytoplasm of tumor giant cells (emperiopolesis) that have been sectioned in a plane that does not include their nuclei.
- Specialty: Oncology

Giant-cell carcinoma of the lung (GCCL) is a rare histological form of large-cell lung carcinoma, a subtype of undifferentiated lung cancer, traditionally classified within the non-small-cell lung carcinomas (NSCLC).

The characteristic feature of this highly lethal malignancy is the distinctive light microscopic appearance of its extremely large cells, which are bizarre and highly pleomorphic, and which often contain more than one huge, misshapen, pleomorphic nucleus ("syncytia"), which result from cell fusion.

Although it is common in the lung cancer literature to refer to histologically mixed tumors containing significant numbers of malignant giant cells as "giant-cell carcinomas", technically a diagnosis of "giant-cell carcinoma" should be limited strictly to neoplasms containing only malignant giant cells (i.e. "pure" giant-cell carcinoma).

Aside from the great heterogeneity seen in lung cancers (especially those occurring among tobacco smokers), the considerable variability in diagnostic and sampling techniques used in medical practice, the high relative proportion of individuals with suspected GCCL who do not undergo complete surgical resection, and the near-universal lack of complete sectioning and pathological examination of resected tumor specimens prevent high levels of quantitative accuracy.

== Classification ==
For several decades, primary lung cancers were consistently dichotomously classified for treatment and research purposes into small-cell lung carcinomas (SCLCs) and non-small-cell lung carcinomas (NSCLCs), based on an oversimplified approach that is now clearly outmoded. The new paradigm recognizes that lung cancers are a large and extremely heterogeneous family of malignant neoplasms, with over 50 different histological variants included in the 4th (2004) revision of the World Health Organization typing system, the most widely used lung cancer classification scheme ("WHO-2004"). These variants are increasingly appreciated as having different genetic, biological, and clinical properties, including prognoses and responses to treatment regimens, and therefore, that correct and consistent histological classification of lung cancers are necessary to validate and implement optimum management strategies.

About 1% of lung cancers are sarcomas, germ cell tumors, and hematopoietic tumors, while 99% of lung cancers are carcinoma. Carcinomas are tumors composed of transformed, abnormal cells with epithelial tissue architecture and/or molecular characteristics, and which derive from embryonic endoderm. Eight major taxa of lung carcinomas are recognized within the WHO-2004 classification:

1. Small-cell carcinoma
2. Squamous cell carcinoma
3. Adenocarcinoma
4. Large-cell carcinoma
5. Adenosquamous carcinoma
6. Sarcomatoid carcinoma
7. Carcinoid
8. Salivary gland-like carcinoma

The subclassification of GCCL among these major taxa has undergone significant changes in recent decades. Under the 2nd revision (1981) of the WHO classification, it was considered a subtype of large-cell carcinoma. In the 3rd (1999) revision, it was placed within a taxon called "Carcinomas with Pleomorphic, Sarcomatoid, or Sarcomatous Elements", along with pleomorphic carcinoma, spindle cell carcinoma, carcinosarcoma, and pulmonary blastoma, which are (arguably) related variants. While the 4th revision ("WHO-2004") retained the same grouping of lesions as the 3rd revision, the name of the major taxon was shortened to "sarcomatoid carcinomas".

The current rules for classifying lung cancers under WHO-2004, while useful and improved, remain to some extent fairly complex, ambiguous, arbitrary, and incomplete. Although it is fairly common for mixed tumors that are seen to contain malignant giant cells to be called "giant-cell carcinomas", accurate classification of a pulmonary tumor as a GCCL requires that the entire tumor consists only of malignant giant cells. Therefore, complete sampling of the entire tumor — obtained via a surgical resection — is absolutely necessary for a definitive diagnosis of GCCL to be made.

== Cytology ==
The background contained numerous lymphocytes and neutrophils. The shape of the tumor cell was spindle or pleomorphic, and the sizes of the tumor cells varied by more than 5-fold. The tumor cells had an abundant, thick and well-demarcated cytoplasm. The location of the nucleus was centrifugal, and the nucleus was oval or irregularly shaped. Multinucleated giant cells were frequently observed. The size of the nucleus was more than 5 times that of normal lymphocytes, and its size also varied by more than 5-fold. The nuclear membrane was thin, and nuclear chromatin was coarsely granular, while the nucleolus was single and round.

In cytological preparations, giant cells typically appear as single cells or in flat loose clusters, and occasionally in fascicles.

GCCL are considered a member of the most common type of lung cancer, called "non-small-cell carcinomas". This group of lethal neoplasms make up approximately 85% of all lung cancers. By the definition of "large-vs.-small-cell carcinoma", the diameter of GCCL cells must be considerably greater than three times that of a resting (i.e. unstimulated) lymphocyte. Also by definition, GCCL do not contain any amount of these small, neurosecretory granule-containing, neuroendocrine cells that are characteristic of small-cell carcinomas — when they do, the tumor should be classified as a combined small-cell carcinoma.

Compared to most other lung cancer variants, cells comprising GCCL tend to be much larger (up to 150 micrometers diameter, or even larger), Both cells and nuclei show extreme variation in size distribution and shape. Carcinomatous giant cells carcinoma nuclei have been reported to average 5 times the size of lymphocyte nuclei.

The cells from giant-cell carcinomas are anaplastic, and show no evidence of cell maturation or differentiation, lacking the cytological and tissue architectural characteristics of squamous cell carcinoma, adenocarcinoma, neuroendocrine carcinomas, or other more differentiated lung cancer cell types. They tend to be highly pleomorphic (i.e. variable in characteristics), but are most often round and/or polygonal in shape, with a relatively low nuclear-to-cytoplasmic ratio. When associated with spindle cells, as they very frequently are in tumors with mixed histology, malignant giant cells tend to form loosely cohesive aggregate structures on cytological examination. However, when a biopsy sample consists purely of malignant giant cells, the cells tend to be single and disaggregated.

Case series suggest that the relative number of giant cells in a given tumor are generally directly proportional to the size of the tumor, and to the relative amount of necrosis.

Giant cells in a lung cancer are highly associated with the presence of spindle cells.

The chromatin of malignant giant cells tends to be hyperchromatic and coarsely clumped. Nucleoli are usually multiple and prominent.

Subcellular characteristics often noted in the malignant giant cells of GCCL cases include abundant mitochondria, concentric whorls of tonofilament-like fibrils, and aggregates of several pairs of centrioles.

Both "tumor cell-tumor cell" and "leukocyte-tumor cell" emperipolesis (i.e. active penetration of the latter by the former) is very commonly seen in cases of GCCL.

== Tissue architectural features ==
In mixed tumors, giant cells are more likely to be found in higher proportions at the edge of a tumor. When extensive necrosis is present, it is possible for a giant-cell tumor to have only a thin rim of viable cells remaining at the perimeter of the mass.

In one early case series, abundant production of loose malignant giant cells were noted to fill the alveoli of patients without destroying, infiltrating, or disturbing the normal underlying architecture, a pathologic behavior that bears some resemblance to the pneumonic variant of bronchioloalveolar carcinoma.

Extensive tumor necrosis and hemorrhage is extremely common in GCCL.

Although the issue has not been extensively studied in a controlled fashion, GCCLs have been noted to contain significantly elevated levels of VEGF. However, in one study where a giant-cell carcinoma tumor that had been completely excised was sectioned and examined, no qualitative or quantitative abnormalities in tissue vascularization were noted.

GCCL have been noted to be encapsulated, and to be divided via septa into "pseudolobules", by a highly fibrous stroma, suggested to be produced commensurately with tumor growth. The capsule is typically infiltrated with malignant giant cells.

== Macroscopic features ==
Giant-cell carcinomas of the lung frequently show extensive necrosis and myxoid degeneration.

A trend toward less vascularity and tissue density (with lower contrast enhancement on CT) has been noted toward the center of these lesions, especially in larger tumors, and even in tumors without a significant volume of gross necrosis.

Grossly, the cut surfaces of these malignancies are often gray-white or tan, and frequently show myxoid, necrotic, and/or hemorrhagic foci. These sorts of areas often show low levels of contrast enhancement on CT scanning.

Low encapsularity and high levels of tissue collagen tend to be observed, with high contrast enhancement in these areas.

GCCL have been seen to develop from/in emphysematous bullae.

== Staining and immunohistochemistry ==
A case of a brain metastasis from a giant-cell lung carcinoma (both "pure") tested positive for cytokeratins AE1/AE3, and negative for CK-7, CK-20, TTF-1, and GFAP.

GCCL cells often stain intensely by Periodic acid-Schiff reagent, suggesting the presence of significant amounts of glycogen in the cell cytoplasm.

== Differential diagnosis ==
Under light microscopy, the giant malignant pleomorphic cells making up a GCCL resemble those found in choriocarcinoma, angiosarcoma, and some forms of true sarcoma, such as malignant fibrous histiocytoma and rhabdomyosarcoma. In some instances, they can also bear considerable resemblance to "activated" histiocytes seen in some inflammatory conditions.

A rare and potentially difficult differential diagnostic dilemma occurs when GCCLs must be separated from pulmonary or mediastinal choriocarcinomas, a critical distinction to be made because while there is a known standard of care for treating choriocarcinoma, as yet there is no generally accepted specific standard treatment for GCCL. Careful review of cell morphology is key to their delineation — while GCCLs show great variation in cell size distributions and morphologies in tumors, choriocarcinomas consistently contain only syncytiotrophoblasts and cytotrophoblasts. GCCL and primary pulmonary choriocarcinoma can also be differentiated on the basis of ultrastructural features by electron microscopy, although EM is not yet widely applicable.

Occasionally, a bone metastasis of a GCCL could potentially be mistaken for a primary giant-cell tumor of bone — the latter entity can behave as a neoplasm of benign, frankly malignant, or borderline in its clinical behavior.

== Sites of metastasis ==
GCCLs are particularly notable among lung cancers for their extremely unusual tendency to metastasize to the small intestine, occasionally causing obstruction, severe bleeding, and/or intussusception. This clinical characteristic of GCCL has been seen in cases spanning over half a century in time.

Within the small bowel, the jejunum seems to be a preferred site for metastasis of GCCL.

GCCL also often metastasizes to bone, adrenal, brain, lung, liver, kidney,

Brain metastases from GCCL are particularly likely to cause significant cerebral hemorrhages as compared to other lung cancer variants, probably due to greatly increased rates of endothelial proliferation and neovascularization, tumor tissue growth, extensive necrosis, and aggressive local infiltrative character of GCCL cells.

== Pathogenesis ==
Several studies, both in giant-cell tumor specimens and in cell lines, have identified rearrangement and amplification of the c-myc oncogene, sometimes in combination with mutations of the K-ras gene.

Overexpression of vascular endothelial growth factor (VEGF) has been shown to occur in GCCL and is thought to be related to the high metastatic potential of this lung cancer variant.

Malignant giant cells identical to those found in GCCL commonly occur in lung cancer cases with a prominent major or minor clear-cell carcinoma pattern (for a discussion about this variant, see for example). They have been hypothesized to derive from an undifferentiated multipotent malignant stem cell precursor that is generated in distal bronchioles via an as yet unknown oncogenetic pathway or oncogenetic driver.

Ultrastructurally, malignant giant cells often contain accumulations of microfilaments arranged in whorls near the cell nucleus. These entities appear similar in structure to microfilaments and bundles found in the D1 cell of the gastro-entero-pancreatic endocrine system, and it has been proposed that these D1 cells may be the cancer stem cell for at least some GCCLs. Identically appearing whorled filament structures have also been produced in certain airway cells of animals after treatment with carcinogenic nitrosamines.

Ultrastructural studies have suggested that the malignant giant cells in GCCL are of endodermal lineage.

Remarkably fast growing tumors.

== Combined/multiphasic tumors containing giant cells ==
Malignant giant cells are commonly found — and vary in relative proportion to a greater or lesser degree — in both primary tumors and metastatases of many different variants of lung carcinomas. A number of authors have noted that bizarre malignant giant cells occur more commonly in primary and secondary tumors — including any remaining tumor "deposits" — that have previously been treated with chemotherapy and/or radiation therapy in adjuvant or neoadjuvant protocols.

== Imaging characteristics ==
GCCL often presents as a large peripheral mass that is severely cavitated.

In a radiographic study of almost 2,000 lung cancer patients published 50 years ago, 3.4% of lung carcinomas proved to be cavitated masses, most of which were squamous cell carcinoma.

In a number of cases of severe cavitation, the resected tumor remnant consists of only a thin rim of proliferating cells.

== Positron emission tomography scanning ==
On positron emission tomography (PET) scanning, GCCL has been found to have exceedingly high standardized uptake values (SUV) for radioactive glucose, values that are statistically significantly higher than in other histological variants of lung cancer.

== Metabolic pathways ==
PET scanning suggests that GCCL are tumors with particularly rapid metabolism, and that the metabolic pathways of GCCL may be unusually dependent on, or interlinked to, glycolysis.

== Paraneoplastic syndromes ==
GCCL have been long known for secretion of the beta subunit of human chorionic gonadotropin (beta-HCG), often in large amounts, which can lead to very high levels of estrogen and painful gynecomastia (breast enlargement) in males as paraneoplastic signs.

Giant-cell lung cancers are well known for their paraneoplastic production and secretion of granulopoietic colony stimulating factor (G-CSF)

GCCL has also been reported to produce plasminogen activator as a paraneoplastic phenomenon.

== Treatment ==
Because of its rarity, there have been no randomized clinical trials of treatment of GCCL, and all information available derives from small retrospective institutional series or multicenter metadata.

== Prognosis ==
Giant-cell lung cancers have long been considered to be exceptionally aggressive malignancies that grow very rapidly and have a very poor prognosis.

Many small series have suggested that the prognosis of lung tumors with giant cells is worse than that of most other forms of non-small-cell lung cancer (NSCLC), including squamous cell carcinoma, and spindle cell carcinoma.

The overall five-year survival rate in GCCL varies between studies but is generally considered to be very low. The (US) Armed Forces Institute of Pathology has reported a figure of 10%, and in a study examining over 150,000 lung cancer cases, a figure of 11.8% was given. However, in the latter report the 11.8% figure was based on data that included spindle cell carcinoma, a variant which is generally considered to have a less dismal prognosis than GCCL. Therefore, the likely survival of "pure" GCCL is probably lower than the stated figure.

In the large 1995 database review by Travis and colleagues, giant-cell carcinoma has the third-worst prognosis among 18 histological forms of lung cancer. (Only small-cell carcinoma and large-cell carcinoma had shorter average survival.)

Most GCCL have already grown and invaded locally and/or regionally, and/or have already metastasized distantly, and are inoperable, at the time of diagnosis.

== Epidemiology ==
The true incidence, prevalence, and mortality of GCCL is generally unknown due to a lack of accurate cancer data on a national level. It is known to be a very rare tumor variant in all populations examined, however. In an American study of a database of over 60,000 lung cancers, GCCL comprised between 0.3% and 0.4% of primary pulmonary malignancies, with an age-adjusted incidence rate of about 3 new cases per million persons per year. With approximately 220,000 total lung cancers diagnosed in the US each year, the proportion suggests that approximately 660 and 880 new cases are diagnosed in Americans annually.

However, in a more recent series of 4,212 consecutive lung cancer cases, only one (0.024%) lesion was determined to be a "pure" giant-cell carcinoma after complete sectioning of all available tumor tissue. While some evidence suggests GCCL may have been considerably more common several decades ago, with one series identifying 3.4% of all lung carcinomas as giant-cell malignancies, it is possible that this number reflect

Most published case series and reports on giant cell-containing lung cancers show that they are diagnosed much more frequently in men than they are in women, with some studies showing extremely high male-to-female ratios (12:1 or more). In a study of over 150,000 people with lung cancer in the US, however, the gender ratio was just over 2:1, with women actually having a higher relative proportion of giant-cell cancers (0.4%) than men (0.3%).

Giant-cell carcinomas have been reported to be diagnosed in a significantly younger population than all non-small-cell carcinomas considered as a group. Like nearly all lung carcinomas, however, GCCs are exceedingly rare in very young people: in the US SEER program, only 2 cases were recorded to occur in persons younger than 30 years of age between 1983 and 1987. The average age at diagnosis of these tumors has been estimated at 60 years.

The vast majority of individuals with GCCL are heavy smokers.

Although the definitions of "central" and "peripheral" can vary between studies, GCCL are consistently diagnosed much more frequently in the lung periphery. In a review of literature compiled by Kallenburg and co-workers, less than 30% of GCCLs arose in the hilum or other parts of the "central" pulmonary tree.

A significant predilection for genesis of GCCL in the upper lobes of patients has also been postulated.

== History ==
Most sources credit Nash and Stout with publishing the first detailed report in the medical literature recognizing GCCL as a distinct clinicopathological entity in 1958. However, there is some evidence that suggests this tumor phenotype was described as early as 1951. In a report on 3 cases of giant-cell lung carcinoma published in 1961 by Z.M. Naib, the author cites 2 previous studies related to GCCL — one published in 1951 by M.M. Patton and co-workers, and one published in 1955 by Walton and Pryce. In 1969, Dr. Alexander Kennedy, in a case series of 3 GCCL Kennedy published in 1969, credited Hadley and Bullock with the first usage of the term "giant-cell carcinoma" 16 years prior.

GCCL was first confirmed as an epithelial tumor (and not a dedifferentiated pleomorphic sarcoma) in 1961. In 1964–65, theories were postulated that GCCLs were dediffentiated adenocarcinomas and, in some cases, were thought to derive from clear-cell adenocarcinomas.
