= Large-cell lung carcinoma with rhabdoid phenotype =

Large Cell Lung Carcinoma with Rhabdoid Phenotype
- Specialty: Oncology

Large cell lung carcinoma with rhabdoid phenotype (LCLC-RP) is a rare histological form of lung cancer, currently classified as a variant of large cell lung carcinoma (LCLC). In order for a LCLC to be subclassified as the rhabdoid phenotype variant, at least 10% of the malignant tumor cells must contain distinctive structures composed of tangled intermediate filaments that displace the cell nucleus outward toward the cell membrane. The whorled eosinophilic inclusions in LCLC-RP cells give it a microscopic resemblance to malignant cells found in rhabdomyosarcoma (RMS), a rare neoplasm arising from transformed skeletal muscle. Despite their microscopic similarities, LCLC-RP is not associated with rhabdomyosarcoma.

Although rhabdoid variants of LCLC are sometimes referred to as "rhabdoid carcinomas", this particular term should be reserved for examples of "pure" rhabdoid neoplasms (i.e. those that do not contain cells containing other histological variants)

== Classification ==
Lung cancers are now considered a large and extremely heterogeneous family of neoplasms that feature widely varying genetic, biological, and clinical characteristics. About 50 different lung cancer variants are recognized under the 2004 revision of the World Health Organization ("WHO-2004") histological typing system, the most widely recognized and used lung cancer classification scheme. Recent studies have shown beyond doubt that the old classification paradigm of "small cell carcinoma vs. non-small cell carcinoma" is now obsolete, and that the correct "subclassification" of lung cancer cases is necessary to assure that patients receive optimum management.

More than 99% of primary lung cancers are carcinoma, which are tumors composed of cells that originate from embryonic ectoderm or endoderm, or that feature epithelial characteristics or differentiation. Eight major groups of lung carcinomas are recognized in WHO-2004:

- Squamous cell lung carcinoma
- Small cell lung carcinoma
- Adenocarcinoma of the lung
- Large cell lung carcinoma
- Adenosquamous carcinoma
- Sarcomatoid carcinoma
- Carcinoid tumor
- Salivary gland-like carcinoma of the lung

LCLC-RP are considered variants of large cell carcinoma.

== Histogenesis ==
The histogenesis of most lung cancers is not well understood. Carcinomas of the lung are thought to arise from the uncontrolled growth of mutated, transformed, multipotent "cancer stem cells" with epithelial characteristics or lineage. When viewed under a light microscope, the transformed cancer cells in LCLC are undifferentiated, lacking specific cytological and tissue architectural characteristics of other types, subtypes, and variants of lung cancer. Election microscopic studies, however, have shown that many LCLC do have ultrastructural characteristics of other tumor types (i.e. adenocarcinoma, squamous cell carcinoma)., and that rhabdoid carcinomas often show similar features.

Some evidence suggests that cells with the rhabdoid phenotype result from mutations occurring in some of the cells descending from the "parent" tumor, leading to the "emergence" of distinct populations of characteristic cells with the rhabdoid phenotype within the parent neoplasm, often in the peripheral part of the tumor. Missense mutations occurring in the cytokeratin 8 (CK-8) gene (RTK 8) at specific codons affects the way the protein products of this gene assume their normal two- and three-dimensional shapes, and may well affect the way the mutant proteins undergo assembly into filamentous structures within the cytoplasm. The defective "protofilament" products apparently accumulate aberrantly, and thus form the distinctive whorled paranuclear inclusions that are characteristic of the rhabdoid cell.

It seems likely that mutations and post-translational modifications affecting cytokeratin 8, cytokeratin 18, and vimentin protofilaments are intimately involved in the genesis of the characteristic inclusions and, therefore, of the rhabdoid phenotype. The particulars of this process are poorly understood, but depend in part on the origin of the tumor and stochastic genomic phenomena.

Rhabdoid cells often express protein products suggestive of aggressive, dedifferentiated cells, including neuroendocrine tumor-related products and granulocyte-macrophage colony stimulating factor (GM-CSF). Vimentin, an intermediate filament protein usually associated with non-carcinomatous tumors (i.e. sarcoma), is ubiquitous in rhabdoid cells. Co-expression of cytokeratins and vimentin are associated with cells undergoing epithelial-mesenchymal transition (EMT).

While undifferentiated large-cell lung carcinoma is the most common parent lung tumor from which a rhabdoid phenotype evolves, malignant cells with a rhabdoid phenotype are known to occur in many different histological variants of lung cancer, including adenocarcinoma, sarcomatoid carcinoma, squamous cell carcinoma, combined large cell neuroencrine carcinoma, and mucinous bronchioloalveolar carcinoma and combined small cell lung carcinoma.

== Metastasis ==
LCLC-RP is generally considered to be an especially aggressive malignancy that metastasizes widely early on in its clinical course. Similar to most other forms of lung carcinoma, LCLC-RP may spread ("metastasize") in three major ways — by local extension and infiltration into surrounding tissues, by lymphatic spread to regional lymph nodes, and through the bloodstream (hematogeneous metastasis) to distant organs and tissues such as the liver, brain, and skeleton.

It has been reported recently that LCLC-RP can metastasize locally within the airways ("aerogeneous spread"), an uncommon mechanism of extension wherein tumor cells migrate along the lung walls and septa, but do not destroy air sacs. Previously, this type of metastatic behavior had not been seen in this particular tumor, being traditionally associated almost exclusively with the "pneumonic" form of pulmonary bronchioloalveolar carcinoma.

== Diagnosis ==
While occasional scattered rhabdoid cell formation occurs with considerable frequency in lung carcinomas, this is not considered to be of clinical significance. According to current classification criteria, a tumor can only be diagnosed as LCLC-RP when an undifferentiated large-cell lung carcinoma contains a rhabdoid cell component that makes up at least 10% of the tumor mass.

Microscopic characteristics of rhabdoid cells include:

- Oval to polygonal cell shape
- Eosinophilic, hyaline-like perinuclear agglomerations of intermediate filaments
- Compressed, eccentric nuclei
- Prominent central macronucleoli (one or two)
- Abundant eosinophilic cytoplasm
- Reticular chromatin pattern

=== Differential Diagnosis ===
The differential diagnosis of LCLC-RP includes secondary metastatic lesions, melanoma of the lung with rhabdoid phenotype, mucinous adenocarcinomas (particularly those featuring signet-ring cells), rhabdomyosarcoma, epitheloid angiosarcoma, pleural mesothelioma, and plasmacytoma.

=== Imaging ===
On radiological imaging, most cases of LCLC-RP are single "coin lesions" or discrete masses, but cases presenting as multiple nodules throughout the lung have also been noted. Cases with inhomogeneous-appearing consolidation on CT have been reported, as well as aerogenous, lepidic-type spread. Some large, centrally located LCLC-RP have been noted to show signs of gross necrosis and cavitation on imaging studies, as well as being associated with the presence of large bullae.

=== Immunohistochemistry ===
Immunohistochemistry is an important factor in diagnosis. Results of immunohistochemistry (IHC) staining in rhabdoid lung cancers tends to reflect the multiphasic nature of these tumors. Typically, markers expressed in LCLC-RP include those seen in "generic" NSCLC's, such as epithelial membrane antigen (EMA, 61%), various cytokeratins (CK's, 80%), and markers associated with the underlying "parent" pulmonary carcinoma. Expression of immunomarkers in the rhabdoid cells, however, have often been noted to be weaker and more diffuse than those in the more differentiated tumor cells. They also more frequently express "non-carcinomatous" markers typically associated with "dedifferentiated" neoplasms. Expression of thyroid transcription factor-1 (TTF-1), a commonly used marker for primary lung cancers, appears to be less frequent in rhabdoid carcinomas than in most other histotypes of pulmonary cancers.

Vimentin, an intermediate filament protein usually found in sarcoma, is ubiquitously (nearly 100%) expressed diffusely throughout the cytoplasm of the rhabdoid cells, and is often intermingled with CK's in their whorled inclusions. Some studied have reported that neuroendocrine-related markers (i.e. neuron-specific enolase (NSE), neural cell adhesion molecule (NCAM), chromogranin A (CgA), synaptophysin), are also quite frequently expressed in a significant proportion of rhabdoid cells.

== Treatment ==
Because LCLC-RP is so rare, no clinical trials have ever been conducted that specifically address treatment of this lung cancer variant. Because LCLC-RP is considered a form of non-small cell lung carcinoma (NSCLC), most physicians adhere to published NSCLC treatment guidelines in rhabdoid carcinoma cases. When possible, radical surgical resection with curative intent is the primary treatment of choice in early stage NSCLC's, and can be administered with or without adjuvant, neoadjuvant, or palliative chemotherapy and/or radiotherapy, depending on the disease stage and performance status of the individual patient.

In numerous clinical trials conducted in NSCLC, several different platinum-based chemotherapy regimens have been shown to be more-or-less equally effective. LCLC's, as a subtype of NSCLC, have traditionally been included in many of these clinical trials, and have been treated like other NSCLC's. More recent trials, however, have shown that some newer agents may have particular effectiveness in prolonging survival of LCLC patients. Pemetrexed, in particular, has shown significant reduction in the hazard ratio for death when used in patients with LCLC. Taxane-based (paclitaxel, docetaxel) chemotherapy was shown to induce a complete and sustained response in a liver metastasis in a case of LCC-RP. A later-appearing metastasis within mediastinal lymph nodes in the same case also showed a durable response to a taxane alone.

There have also been reports of rhabdoid carcinomas expressing vascular endothelial growth factor (VEGF), suggesting that targeted molecular therapy with VEGF blocking monoclonal antibodies such as bevacizumab may be active in these variants. However, evidence suggests that caution must be used when treating a cavitated rhabdoid tumor, one that contains significant components of squamous cell differentiation, or large tumors with containing major blood vessels, due to the potential high risk of life-threatening pulmonary hemorrhage.

A recent study reported a case wherein 2 courses of adjuvant therapy with cisplatin and paclitaxel, followed by oral gefitinib, were used after complete resection. The patient had had no recurrence 34 months later.

As large-volume LCLC-RP may show significant central necrosis and cavitation, prudence dictates that oncologists use extreme caution if contemplating the therapeutic use of bevacizumab, other anti-VEGF compounds, or anti-angiogenesis agents in general, which have been associated with a greatly increased risk of severe hemorrhage and hemoptysis that may be quickly fatal in cavatated pulmonary squamous cell carcinomas. Similar elevated risks have also been noted in tumors located near, or containing, large blood vessels.,

== Prognosis ==
LCLC-RP are considered to be especially aggressive tumors with a dismal prognosis. Many published cases have shown short survival times after diagnosis. Some studies suggest that, as the proportion of rhabdoid cells in the tumor increases, the prognosis tends to worsen, although this is most pronounced when the proportion of rhabdoid cells exceeds 5%. With regard to "parent" neoplasms other than LCLC, adenocarcinomas with rhabdoid features have been reported to have worse prognoses than adenocarcinomas without rhabdoid features, although an "adenocarcinoma with rhabdoid phenotype" tumor variant has not been specifically recognized as a distinct entity under the WHO-2004 classification system.

There are case reports of rhabdoid carcinomas recurring after unusually long periods, which is unusual for a fast-growing, aggressive tumor type. One report described a very early stage patient whose tumor recurred 6 years after initial treatment. Although rapidly progressive, fulminant courses seem to be the rule in this entity, long-term survival has also been noted, even post-metastectomy in late stage, distant metastatic disease.

== Epidemiology ==
Although reliable and comprehensive incidence statistics are nonexistent, LCLC-RP is a rare tumor, with only a few hundred cases described in the scientific literature to date. LCLC's made up about 10% of lung cancers in most historical series, equating to approximately 22,000 cases per year in the U.S. Of these LCLC cases, it is estimated that about 1% will eventually develop the rhabdoid phenotype during tumor evolution and progression. In one large series of 902 surgically resected lung cancers, only 3 cases (0.3%) were diagnosed as LCLC-RP. In another highly selected series of large-cell lung carcinoma cases, only 4 of 45 tumors (9%) were diagnosed as the rhabdoid phenotype using the 10% criterion, but another 10 (22%) had at least some rhabdoid cell formation. It appears likely, therefore, that LCLC-RP probably comprises between 0.1% and 1.0% of all lung malignancies.

Similar to nearly all variants of lung carcinoma, large cell lung carcinoma with rhabdoid phenotype appears to be highly related to tobacco smoking. It also appears to be significantly more common in males than in females.

== Future research ==
As the rhabdoid phenotype may exclusively be associated with certain missense mutations in the CK-8 gene (or, possibly, the vimentin gene — see above), it may prove possible to develop specific monoclonal antibodies against certain peptides in these aberrant gene products that may target only rhabdoid cells with these specific mutations. Recent reports suggest that antibodies may be easier to get into the interior of cells than previously thought.

== History ==
Although Colby and colleagues were the first to report a primary lung cancer with a rhabdoid phenotype in a paper published in 1995, cells with these characteristic features had been previously noted in 1978, when they were noted to occur in a rare and extremely aggressive form of kidney cancer that appears almost exclusively in young children called "Wilms tumor".

LCLC-RP were first recognized as a distinct entity under the 3rd (published in 1999) revision of the World Health Organization (WHO) lung tumor histological typing scheme. Its placement in the classification schema went unchanged during the 2004 revision.
