= Epithelial-myoepithelial carcinoma of the lung =

- Other names: EMECL Adenomyoepithelioma, Myoepithelioma, Epithelial-myoepithelial tumor, Epimyoepithelial carcinoma, Malignant mixed tumor containing epithelial and myoepithelial cells.
- Specialty: Oncology

Epithelial-myoepithelial carcinoma of the lung is a very rare histologic form of malignant epithelial neoplasm ("carcinoma") arising from lung tissue.

== Genetics ==
The epithelial component in EMECL's typically strongly express cytokeratins, but are negative for actin and S-100 protein, while the myoepithelial component stains strongly for actin and S-100 protein, and only focally weakly for cytokeratins.

== Diagnosis ==
Microscopically, EMECL features bi-layered glandular or ductular structures consisting of inner cuboidal cells and outer multipolar cells.

The histologic appearance of these tumors varied, but all shared the common feature of a biphasic proliferation of epithelial (strong cytokeratin-positive; actin and S-100-negative) and myoepithelial (strong actin and S-100 and focal weak cytokeratin-positive) cells with formation of bilayered ductlike structures. The focal resemblance to other salivary gland-type tumors may cause diagnostic difficulties, particularly in small endobronchial biopsies. Although little is known about their biologic potential due to limited follow-up data, these tumors when in the lung clearly have the capacity to infiltrate and metastasize and therefore should be designated as epithelial-myoepithelial carcinoma. At present, it appears that treatment by complete surgical resection with negative margins alone is appropriate and adequate.

=== Classification ===
Lung cancer is an extremely heterogeneous family of malignant neoplasms, with well over 50 different histological variants recognized under the 4th revision of the World Health Organization (WHO) typing system ("WHO-2004"), currently the most widely used lung cancer classification scheme. Because these variants have differing genetic, biological, and clinical properties, including response to treatment, correct classification of lung cancer cases are necessary to assure that lung cancer patients receive optimum management.

The WHO-2004 scheme groups lung carcinomas into 8 major types:

- Squamous cell carcinoma
- Small cell carcinoma
- Adenocarcinoma
- Large cell carcinoma
- Adenosquamous carcinoma
- Sarcomatoid carcinoma
- Carcinoid tumor
- Salivary gland-like carcinoma

EMECL is considered a subtype of salivary gland-like carcinoma, tumors so named because their histological appearance and characteristics closely resemble malignant neoplasms arising in the major and minor salivary glands.

=== Staging ===
EMECL is staged in the same manner as other non-small cell lung carcinomas, based on the TNM (Tumor-Node-Metastasis) staging system.

== Treatment ==
Complete radical surgical resection is the treatment of choice for EMECL, and in most cases, results in long-term survival or cure.

== Prognosis ==
The prognosis of EMECL is relatively good, and considerably better than most other forms of NSCLC. The skull and dura are possible sites for metastasis from pulmonary EMC. The MIB-1 index is a predictive marker of malignant potential.

== Incidence ==
EMECL is extremely rare, with only a handful of cases reported in the literature.

In the lung, two salivary gland-like carcinomas, mucoepidermoid carcinoma and adenoid cystic carcinoma, while extremely uncommon, occur far more often than does EMECL.
