= Stenoparib =

Clinical data
- Other names: 2X-121, E7449, E-7449

Identifiers
- IUPAC name: 11-(1,3-dihydroisoindol-2-ylmethyl)-2,3,10,12-tetrazatricyclo[7.3.1.05,13]trideca-1,5(13),6,8,11-pentaen-4-one
- CAS Number: 1140964-99-3
- PubChem CID: 135565981
- DrugBank: DB16063
- ChemSpider: 35308197
- UNII: 9X5A2QIA7C
- ChEMBL: ChEMBL3644587

Chemical and physical data
- Formula: C_{18}H_{15}N_{5}O
- Molar mass: 317.352 g·mol^{−1}
- 3D model (JSmol): Interactive image
- SMILES: O=C1NN=C2NC(CN3CC4=C(C3)C=CC=C4)=NC3=C2C1=CC=C3
- InChI: InChI=1S/C18H15N5O/c24-18-13-6-3-7-14-16(13)17(21-22-18)20-15(19-14)10-23-8-11-4-1-2-5-12(11)9-23/h1-7H,8-10H2,(H,22,24)(H,19,20,21); Key:JLFSBHQQXIAQEC-UHFFFAOYSA-N

Stenoparib, also known as 2X-121 and previously designated E7449, is an investigational new drug under evaluation for the treatment of advanced cancers, including ovarian cancer. It is an orally available small molecule that functions as a dual poly(ADP-ribose) polymerase (PARP) inhibitor (PARP1/2) and tankyrase inhibitor (tankyrase 1/2). Stenoparib has not been approved by the U.S. Food and Drug Administration (FDA).

== Clinical development ==
Stenoparib has been evaluated in Phase 2 clinical trials for the treatment of COVID-19 and certain cancer types. The drug has received FDA Fast Track designation, and development includes a companion diagnostic (Drug Response Predictor, DRP) intended to guide patient selection.

== Pharmacology ==
Stenoparib combines two mechanisms of action: inhibition of PARP, which disrupts DNA repair in tumor cells, and inhibition of tankyrase, which interferes with Wnt/β-catenin signaling.

== Chemistry ==
Stenoparib belongs to the class of quinazoline heterocycles with fused rings.
