= Spindle cell sarcoma =

Type of connective tissue cancer

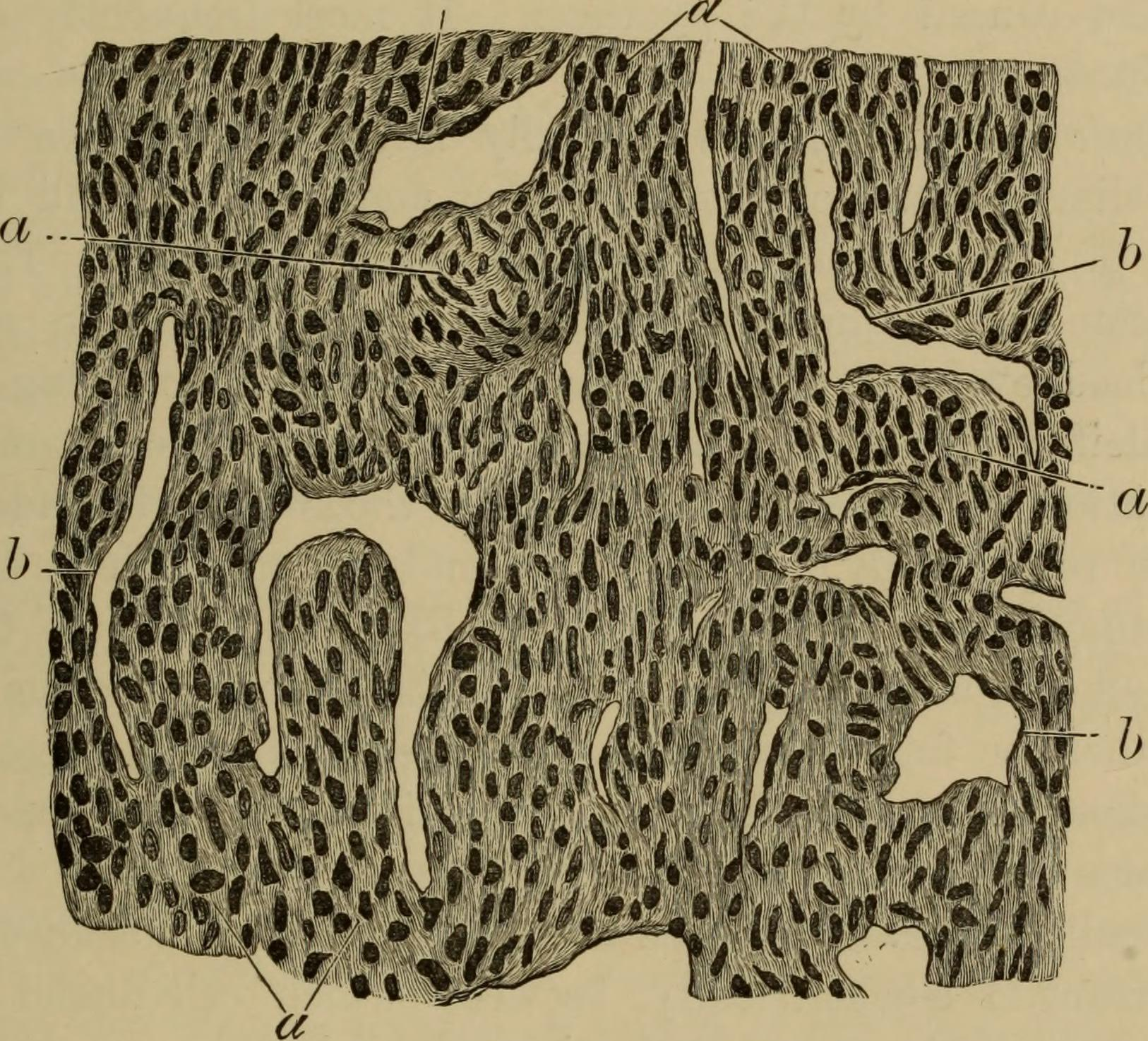
Spindle cell sarcoma in muscle tissue

Spindle cell sarcoma is a type of connective tissue cancer. The tumors generally begin in layers of connective tissue, as found under the skin, between muscles, and surrounding organs, and will generally start as a small, inflamed lump, which grows in size. At first, the lump is, small in size, as the tumor exists in stage 1, and will not necessarily expand beyond its encapsulated form. However, it may develop cancerous traits that can only be detected through microscopic examination or cell-level molecular analysis. As such, at Stage 1, the tumor is usually treated by excision, which includes wide margins of healthy-looking tissue, followed by thorough biopsy, and additional excision, if necessary. The prognosis for a stage 1 tumor excision is usually fairly optimistic, but if the tumor progresses to levels 2 and 3, prognosis worsens, due to tumor cells' likely having spread to other parts of the body, including nearby healthy tissues, or to system-wide locations that include the lungs, kidneys, and liver. In these cases, prognosis is grim and chemotherapy and radiation are the only methods of controlling the cancer.

A variety of factors influence the incidence of spindle cell sarcoma, including genetic predisposition, but it may also be caused by a combination of other factors, including injury and inflammation in patients who are already thought to be predisposed to such tumors. Normal spindle cells are a naturally occurring part of the body's response to injury. In response to an injury, infection, or other immune response, the spindle cells of connective tissue will begin dividing to heal the affected area; if the tissue is predisposed to spindle cell cancer, the high cellular turnover may result in a cell mutating, becoming cancerous, and forming a tumor.

== See also ==
- Spindle cell carcinoma
