= Salivary gland–like carcinoma of the lung =

- Specialty: Oncology

Salivary gland–like carcinomas of the lung generally refers a class of rare cancers that arise from the uncontrolled cell division (mitosis) of mutated cancer stem cells in lung tissue. They take their name partly from the appearance of their abnormal cells, whose structure and features closely resemble those of cancers that form in the major salivary glands (parotid glands, submandibular glands and sublingual glands) of the head and neck. Carcinoma is a term for malignant neoplasms derived from cells of epithelial lineage, and/or that exhibit cytological or tissue architectural features characteristically found in epithelial cells.

== Types ==
This class of primary lung cancers contains several histological variants, including mucoepidermoid carcinoma of the lung, adenoid cystic carcinoma of the lung, epithelial-myoepithelial carcinoma of the lung, and other (even more rare) variants.

== Diagnosis ==
=== Classification ===
Lung cancer is a large and exceptionally heterogeneous family of malignancies. Over 50 different histological variants are explicitly recognized within the 2004 revision of the World Health Organization (WHO) typing system ("WHO-2004"), currently the most widely used lung cancer classification scheme. Many of these entities are rare, recently described, and poorly understood. However, since different forms of malignant tumors generally exhibit diverse genetic, biological, and clinical properties — including response to treatment — accurate classification of lung cancer cases are critical to assuring that patients with lung cancer receive optimum management.

Under WHO-2004, lung carcinomas are divided into 8 major taxa:

- Squamous cell carcinoma
- Small cell carcinoma
- Adenocarcinoma
- Large cell carcinoma
- Adenosquamous carcinoma
- Sarcomatoid carcinoma
- Carcinoid tumor
- Salivary gland-like carcinoma

== Treatment ==
Treatment options may include surgery, radiation, and chemotherapy. Icotinib has been temporarily effective at treating salivary gland-like carcinoma of the lung but loses efficiency after three months.
