= Myoepithelial cell =

Cells usually found in glandular epithelium

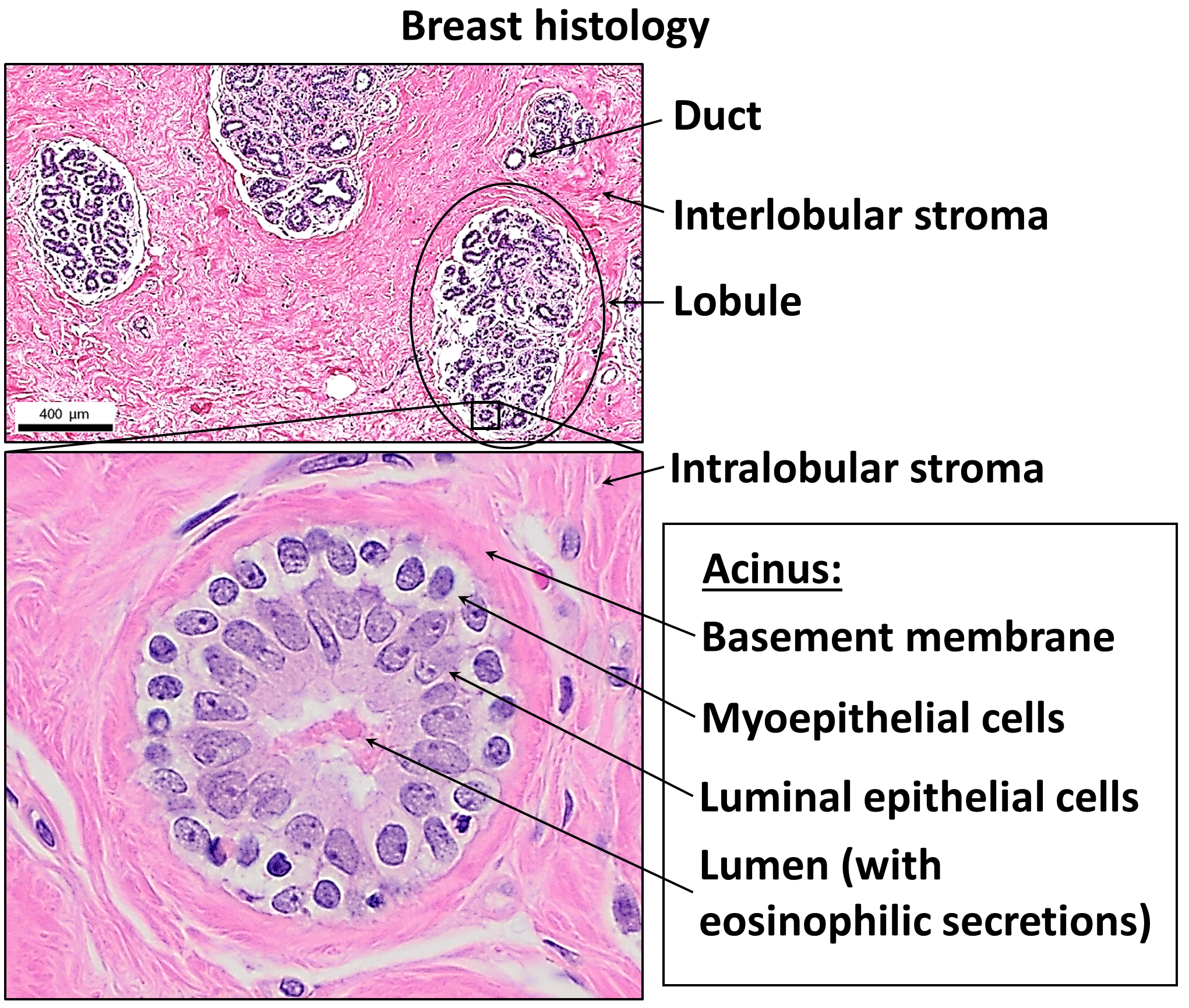
- Normal histology of the breast, with myoepithelial cell annotated near bottom right.

Details

Identifiers
- Latin: myoepitheliocytus
- TH: H2.00.02.0.03059
- FMA: 67799 67805, 67799

Myoepithelial cells (sometimes referred to as myoepithelium) are cells usually found in glandular epithelium as a thin layer above the basement membrane but generally beneath the luminal cells. These may be positive for alpha smooth muscle actin and can contract and expel the secretions of exocrine glands. They are found in the sweat glands, mammary glands, lacrimal glands, and salivary glands. Myoepithelial cells in these cases constitute the basal cell layer of an epithelium that harbors the epithelial progenitor. In the case of wound healing, myoepithelial cells reactively proliferate. Presence of myoepithelial cells in a hyperplastic tissue proves the benignity of the gland and, when absent, indicates cancer. Only rare cancers like adenoid cystic carcinomas contains myoepithelial cells as one of the malignant components.

It can be found in endoderm or ectoderm.

== Markers ==
Myoepithelial cells are true epithelial cells positive for keratins, not to be confused with myofibroblasts which are true mesenchymal cells positive for vimentin. These cells are generally positive for alpha smooth muscle actin (αSMA), cytokeratin 5/6 and other high molecular weight cytokeratins, p63 and caldesmon. Myoepithelial cells are stellate in shape and are also known as basket cells. They lie between the basement membrane and glandular epithelium. Each cell consists of a cell body from which 4-8 processes radiate and embrace the secretory unit. Myoepithelial cells have contractile functions. They help in expelling secretions from the lumen of secretory units and facilitate the movement of saliva in salivary ducts.

== Tumors ==
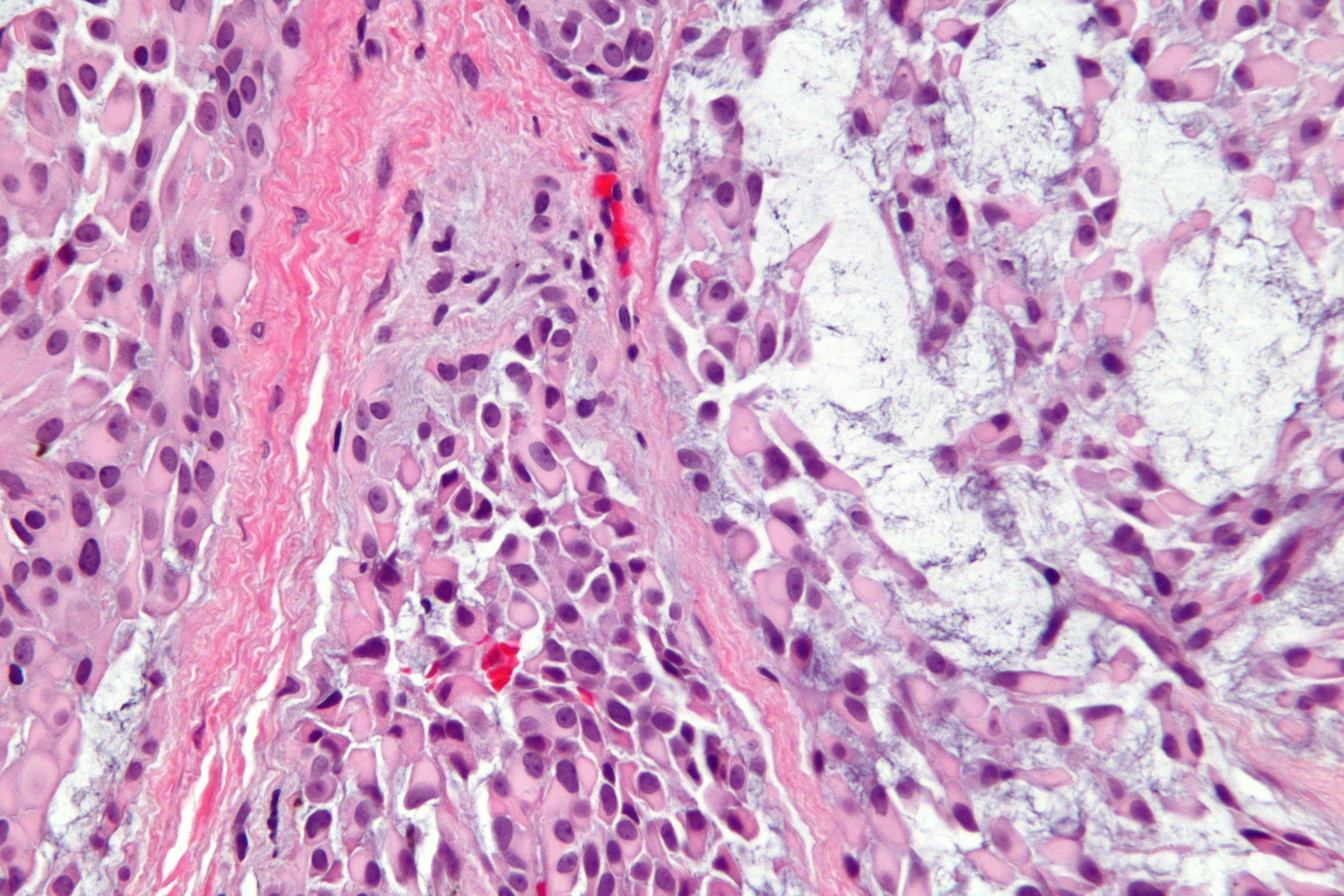
Myoepithelioma, here with plasma cell-like myoepithelial cell.

- Myoepithelioma of the head and neck – A (usually) benign tumor of the head/neck consisting of solely myoepithelial cells.
- Epithelial-myoepithelial carcinoma (of the salivary glands) – A low-grade malignant tumor composed of both neoplastic epithelial and neoplastic myoepithelial cells (a biphasic tumor).
- Epithelial-myoepithelial carcinoma of the lung – A malignant tumor composed of both epithelial and myoepithelial tissues whose pathology resemble salivary cells.
- Adenomyoepithelioma of the breast – A (usually) benign tumor of the breast composed of Myoepithelial and Adeno (glandular) cells.
- Myoepithelioma of the breast – A usually benign or exceedingly rare malignant tumor which mimics IDC but with cells resembling adenoid cysts. If malignant, this is also known as a Myoepithelial carcinoma.

== See also ==
- List of distinct cell types in the adult human body
