= Sarcomatoid carcinoma of the lung =

- Specialty: Oncology/pulmonology

Sarcomatoid carcinoma of the lung is a term that encompasses five distinct histological subtypes of lung cancer, including (1) pleomorphic carcinoma, (2) spindle cell carcinoma, (3) giant cell carcinoma, (4) carcinosarcoma, or (5) pulmonary blastoma.

== Genetics ==
Abnormal duplication of the EGFR gene is a relatively infrequent phenomenon in SCL (>/= 4 copies in >/= 40% of cells in 5/22).

Overexpression of the EGFR protein occurs in nearly all cases (22/22).

Mutations of the EGFR gene are relatively rare (0/23).

K-ras mutations found in 8/22 cases (Gly12Cys in 6 cases and Gly12Val in 2 cases).

SCL show intense immune infiltration which is predominantly neutrophillic. However the tumors evade the immune system by increased expression of a negative regulator of T-cells mainly programmed death ligand-1.

== Diagnosis ==
=== Classification ===
Lung cancer is a large and exceptionally heterogeneous family of malignancies. Over 50 different histological variants are explicitly recognized within the 2004 revision of the World Health Organization (WHO) typing system ("WHO-2004"), currently the most widely used lung cancer classification scheme. Many of these entities are rare, recently described, and poorly understood. However, since different forms of malignant tumors generally exhibit diverse genetic, biological, and clinical properties, including response to treatment, accurate classification of lung cancer cases are critical to assuring that patients with lung cancer receive optimum management.

Approximately 98% of lung cancers are carcinoma, a term for malignant neoplasms derived from cells of epithelial lineage, and/or that exhibit cytological or tissue architectural features characteristically found in epithelial cells. Under WHO-2004, lung carcinomas are divided into 8 major taxa:

- Squamous cell carcinoma
- Small cell carcinoma
- Adenocarcinoma
- Large cell carcinoma
- Adenosquamous carcinoma
- Sarcomatoid carcinoma
- Carcinoid tumor
- Salivary gland-like carcinoma

Sarcomatoid carcinomas are unique among lung carcinomas in that, although they are considered carcinomas, they contain cytological and tissue architectural features that are usually characteristic of sarcoma.

== Treatment ==
Because these tumors are so rare, there have been no randomized clinical trials yet conducted with respect to specific treatment regimens for any subtype.

Very few histospecific studies of individual subtypes SCL have been published in the literature; most data has been small retrospective case series or case reports.

In many cases, SCL are generally treated like other NSCLC. However, as SCL are considered particularly aggressive non-small cell lung cancers, some experts recommend particularly aggressive treatment approach to these tumors.

Little is known about the effects of EGFR inhibitors in SC, although some evidence suggests that these tumors are not likely to be highly responsive.

== Prognosis ==
As a group, SCL prognosis is considered to be worse than that of most types of NSCLC.
