= Fibrocartilaginous mesenchymoma of bone =

- Specialty: Oncology

Fibrocartilaginous mesenchymoma of bone (FCMB) is an extremely rare tumor first described in 1984. About 26 cases have been reported in literature, with patient ages spanning from 9 to 25 years, though a case in a male infant aged 1 year and 7 months has been reported. Quick growth and bulky size are remarkable features of this tumor.

== Diagnosis ==
The most common locations are the shaft and epyphises of long bones (fibula and humerus) but the spine, metatarsal bones, and ilium have been involved as well. Radiologic examination evidences osteolytic areas with a lobulated framework comprising radiolucent and radiodense foci admixed to speckled calcification. Cortical destruction is a common finding with no soft tissue expansion in many cases. Histopathology of the lesion shows large areas of mature fibrous stroma undergoing hyaline cartilage metaplasia resulting in conspicuous lobules or gradual transformation into chondroid foci. Both hyaline cartilage and chondroid in turn undergo calcification and endochondral cancellous bone formation mimicking epiphyseal plate-like cartilage.

Differential diagnosis is concerned with fibrocartilaginous dysplasia of bone, desmoplastic fibroma, low-grade fibrosarcoma, chondromyxoid fibroma and low-grade chondrosarcoma.

A full account of imaging findings on radiography, bone scan, CT and magnetic resonance has been provided by Sumner et al.

== Treatment ==
Surgery is curative despite possible local relapses. Wide resection of the tumor and resection arthrodesis with an intramedullary nail, vertebrectomy and femoral head allograft replacement of the vertebral body, resection of the iliac wing and hip joint disarticulation have been among the performed procedures.

The close resemblance of FCMB to fibrocartilaginous dysplasia has suggested to some scholars that they might be closely related entities, although the latter features woven bone trabeculae without osteoblastic rimming, which is a quite distinctive aspect. Instead, the occurrence of epiphyseal plate-like cartilage is peculiar of the former.
