= Adenosquamous lung carcinoma =

- Specialty: Oncology/pulmonology

Adenosquamous lung carcinoma (AdSqLC) is a biphasic malignant tumor arising from lung tissue that is composed of at least 10% by volume each of squamous cell carcinoma (SqCC) and adenocarcinoma (AdC) cells.

== Classification ==
Lung cancers have been historically classified using two major paradigms. Histological classification systems group lung cancers according to the appearance of the cells and surrounding tissues when they are viewed under a microscope. Clinical classification systems divide lung cancers into groups based on medical criteria, particularly their response to different treatment regimens.

Before the mid-1900s, lung cancer was considered to be a single disease entity, with all forms treated similarly. In the 1960s, small cell lung carcinoma (SCLC) was recognized as a unique form of lung cancer, based both on its appearance (histology) and its clinical properties, including much greater susceptibility to chemotherapy and radiation, more rapid growth rate, and its propensity to metastasize widely early on in its course. Since then, most oncologists have based patient treatment decisions on a dichotomous division of lung cancers into SCLC and non-small cell lung carcinomas (NSCLC), with the former being treated primarily with chemoradiation, and the latter with surgery.

An explosion of new knowledge, accumulated mainly over the last 20 years, has proved that lung cancers should be considered an extremely heterogeneous family of neoplasms with widely varying genetic, biological, and clinical characteristics, particularly their responsiveness to the large number of newer treatment protocols. Well over 50 different histological variants are now recognized under the 2004 revision of the World Health Organization ("WHO-2004") typing system, currently the most widely used lung cancer classification scheme. Recent studies have shown beyond doubt that the old clinical classification paradigm of "SCLC vs. NSCLC" is now obsolete, and that correct "subclassification" of lung cancer cases is necessary to assure that lung cancer patients receive optimum management.

Approximately 98% of lung cancers are carcinoma, which are tumors composed of cells with epithelial characteristics. LCLC's are one of 8 major groups of lung carcinomas recognized in WHO-2004:

- Squamous cell carcinoma
- Small cell carcinoma
- Adenocarcinoma
- Large cell carcinoma
- Adenosquamous carcinoma
- Sarcomatoid carcinoma
- Carcinoid tumor
- Salivary gland-like carcinoma
