= Sarcomatoid carcinoma =

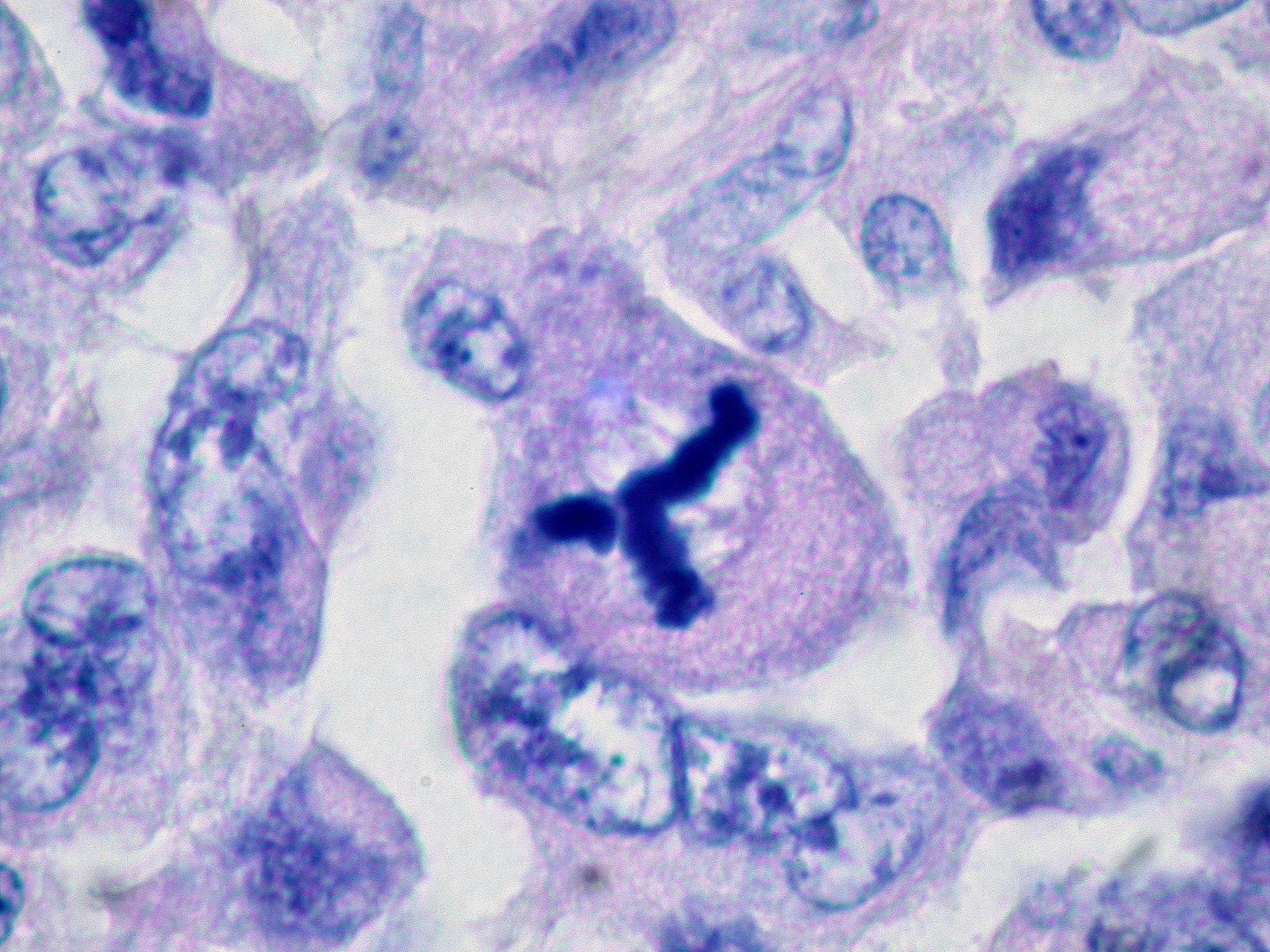
- Metaplastic (sarcomatoid) carcinoma of the breast.
- Specialty: Oncology

Sarcomatoid carcinoma, sometimes referred to as pleomorphic carcinoma, is a relatively uncommon form of cancer whose malignant cells have histological, cytological, or molecular properties of both epithelial tumors ("carcinoma") and mesenchymal tumors ("sarcoma"). It is believed that sarcomatoid carcinomas develop from more common forms of epithelial tumors.

== Types ==
Sarcomatoid carcinoma is a type of rare lung tumour under the category of poorly differentiated non-small-cell lung carcinoma (NSCLC). Based on its histological characteristics, it can be classified into giant cell carcinoma (almost completely consists of giant cells), spindle cell carcinoma (almost completely consists of spindle cells), pleomorphic carcinoma (at least 10% spindle/giant cells or consists of giant and spindle cells only), carcinosarcoma (mix of NSCLC and true sarcoma), and biphasic pulmonary blastoma (consists of embryonal type epithelial element and primitive mesenchymal stroma).

== Locations ==
Sarcomatoid carcinomas have been identified in the small intestine in rare cases. They may have epithelioid and mesenchymal properties or be composed only of mesenchymal-type spindle cells, and are negative for CD117 and DOG1.

Some cases of sarcomatoid carcinoma of the larynx are resistant to radiotherapy.

== Epidemiology ==
This type of tumour has less than 1% incidence of all primary lung cancers. Primary lung tumours originated from the tissues of the lung, not metastasized from other locations in the body.
