= Carcinoma =

Malignancy that develops from epithelial cells

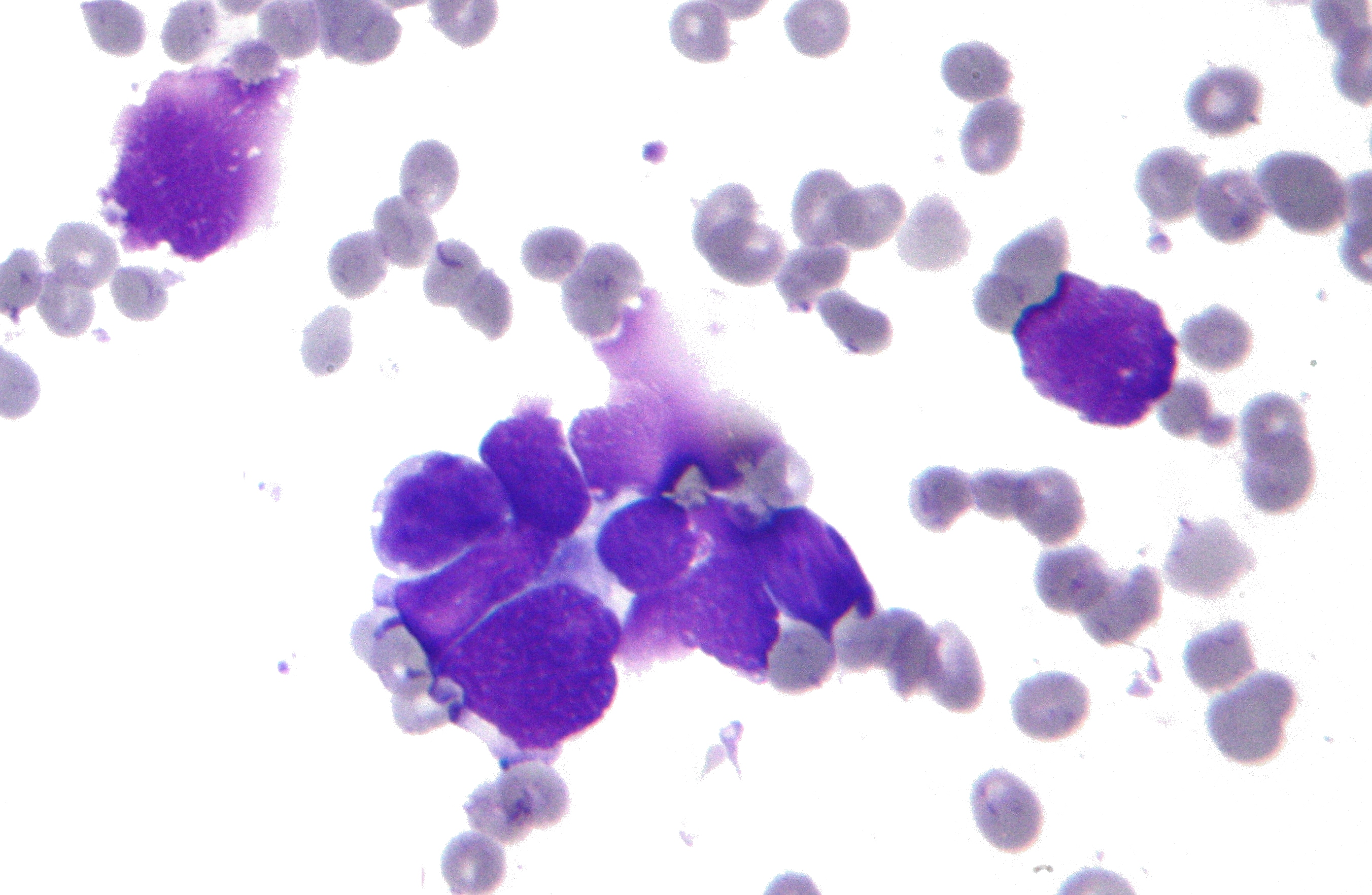
- Micrograph of a lung primary small cell carcinoma, a type of carcinoma. The clustered cancerous cells consist primarily of nucleus (purple); they have only a scant rim of cytoplasm. The surrounding pale staining, discoid cells are red blood cells. Cytopathology specimen. Field stain.
- Specialty: Oncology

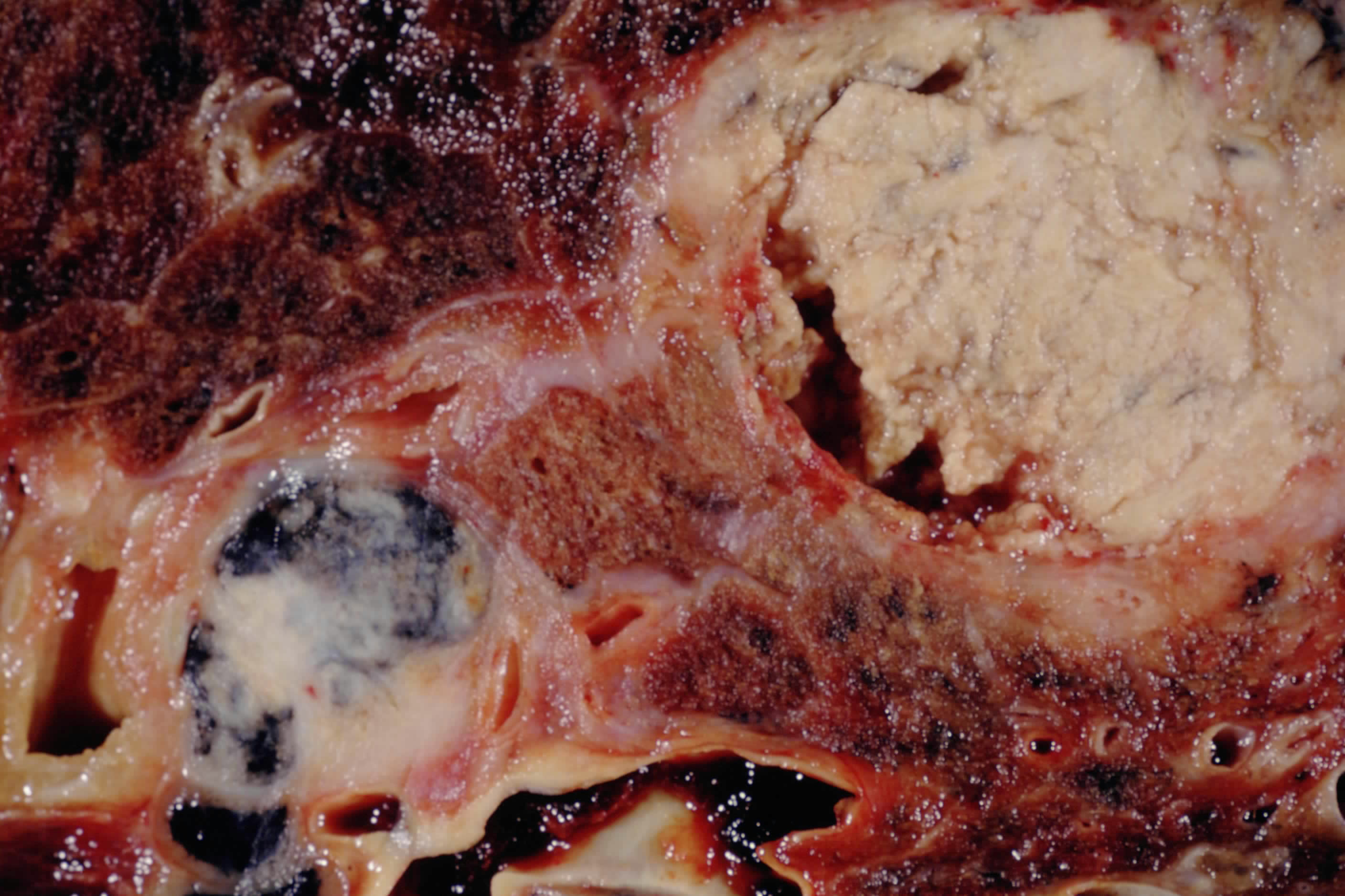
Squamous cell carcinoma occluding bronchus, with lymph node metastasis

Carcinoma is a malignancy that develops from epithelial cells. Specifically, a carcinoma is a cancer that begins in a tissue that lines the inner or outer surfaces of the body, and that arises from cells originating in the endodermal, mesodermal or ectodermal germ layer during embryogenesis.

Carcinomas occur when the DNA of a cell is damaged or altered and the cell begins to grow uncontrollably and becomes malignant.

The word is derived from the Greek: καρκίνωμα, romanized: karkinoma, lit. 'sore, ulcer, cancer' (itself derived from karkinos meaning crab).

== Classification ==
As of 2004, no simple and comprehensive classification system has been devised and accepted within the scientific community. Traditionally, however, malignancies have generally been classified into various types using a combination of criteria, including:

The cell type from which they start; specifically:

- Epithelial cells ⇨ carcinoma
- Non-hematopoietic mesenchymal cells ⇨ sarcoma
- Hematopoietic cells
  - Bone marrow–derived cells that normally mature in the bloodstream ⇨ leukemia
  - Bone marrow-derived cells that normally mature in the lymphatic system ⇨ lymphoma
- Germ cells ⇨ germinoma

Other criteria that play a role include:

- The degree to which the malignant cells resemble their normal, untransformed counterparts
- The appearance of the local tissue and stromal architecture
- The anatomical location from which tumors arise
- Genetic, epigenetic, and molecular features

=== Histological types ===
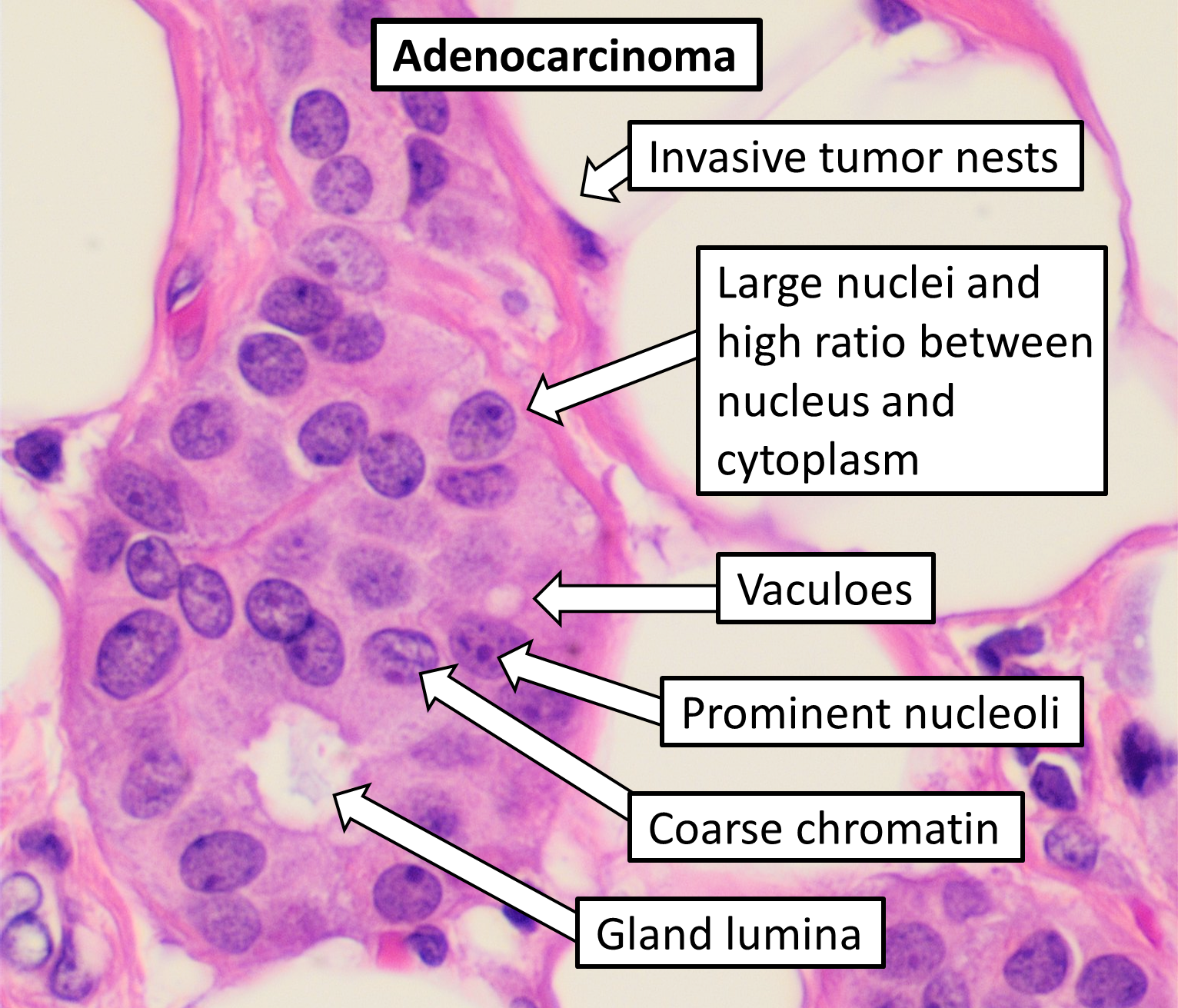
Adenocarcinoma with typical features, although they vary substantially from case to case

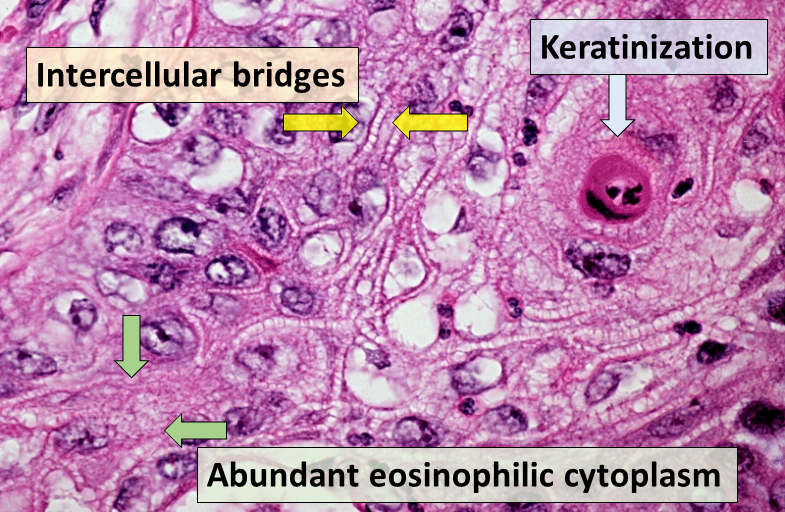
Squamous cell carcinoma with typical features

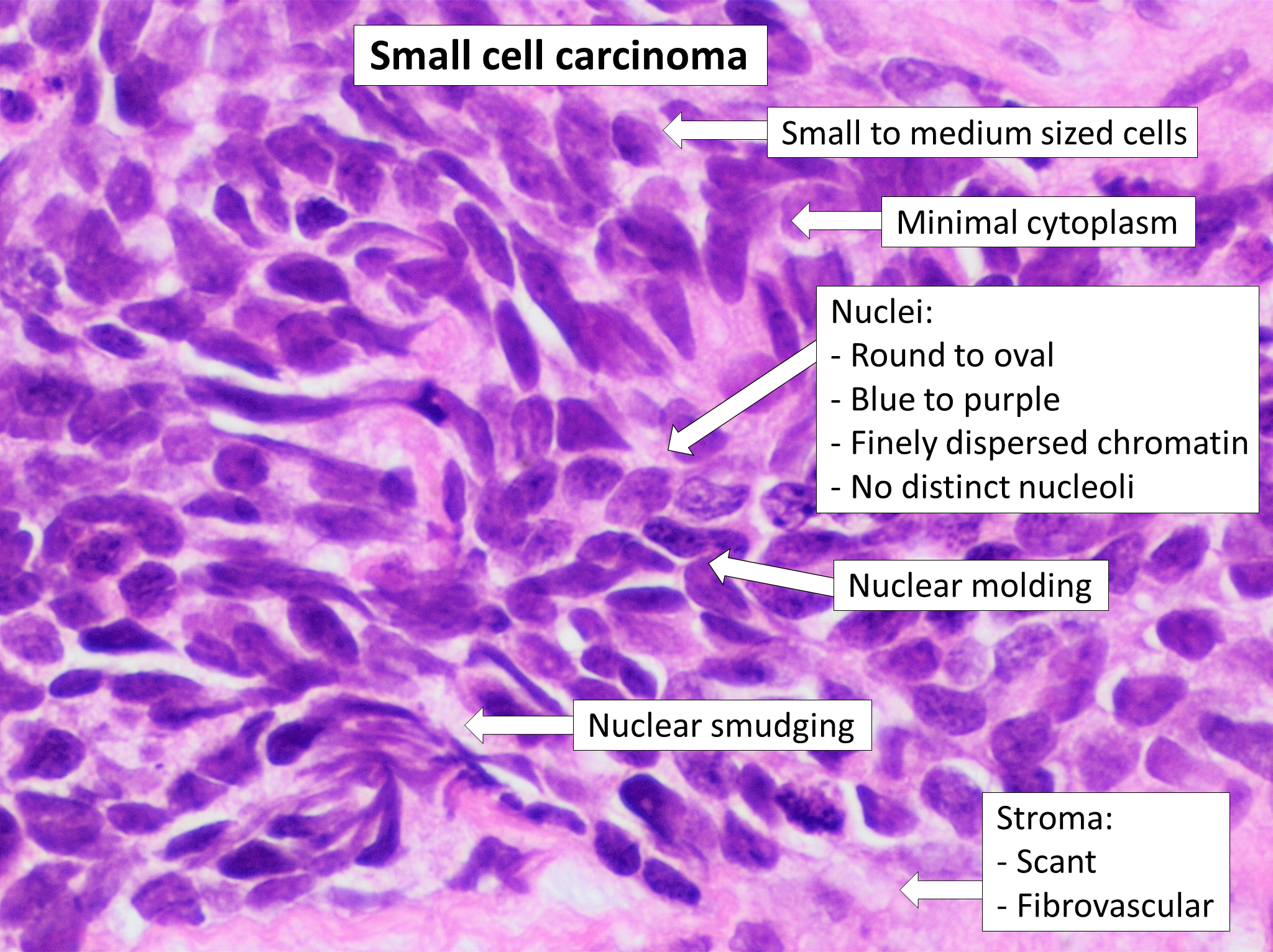
Histopathology of small-cell carcinoma, with typical findings

Adenocarcinoma (adeno = gland)
Refers to a carcinoma featuring microscopic glandular-related tissue cytology, tissue architecture, and/or gland-related molecular products, e.g., mucin.
Squamous cell carcinoma
Refers to a carcinoma with observable features and characteristics indicative of squamous differentiation (intercellular bridges, keratinization, squamous pearls).
Adenosquamous carcinoma
Refers to a mixed tumor containing both adenocarcinoma and squamous cell carcinoma, wherein each of these cell types comprise at least 10% of the tumor volume.
Anaplastic carcinoma
Refers to a heterogeneous group of high-grade carcinomas that feature cells lacking distinct histological or cytological evidence of any of the more specifically differentiated neoplasms. These tumors are referred to as anaplastic or undifferentiated carcinomas.
Large cell carcinoma
Composed of large, monotonous rounded or overtly polygonal-shaped cells with abundant cytoplasm.
Small cell carcinoma
Cells are usually round and are less than approximately three times the diameter of a resting lymphocyte and with little evident cytoplasm. Occasionally, small cell malignancies may themselves have significant components of slightly polygonal and/or spindle-shaped cells.

There are a large number of rare subtypes of anaplastic, undifferentiated carcinoma. Some of the more well known include the lesions containing pseudo-sarcomatous components: spindle cell carcinoma (containing elongated cells resembling connective tissue cancers), giant cell carcinoma (containing huge, bizarre, multinucleated cells), and sarcomatoid carcinoma (mixtures of spindle and giant cell carcinoma). Pleomorphic carcinoma contains spindle cell and/or giant cell components, plus at least a 10% component of cells characteristic of more highly differentiated types (i.e. adenocarcinoma and/or squamous cell carcinoma). Very rarely, tumors may contain individual components resembling both carcinoma and true sarcoma, including carcinosarcoma and pulmonary blastoma. A history of cigarette smoking is the most common cause of large cell carcinoma.

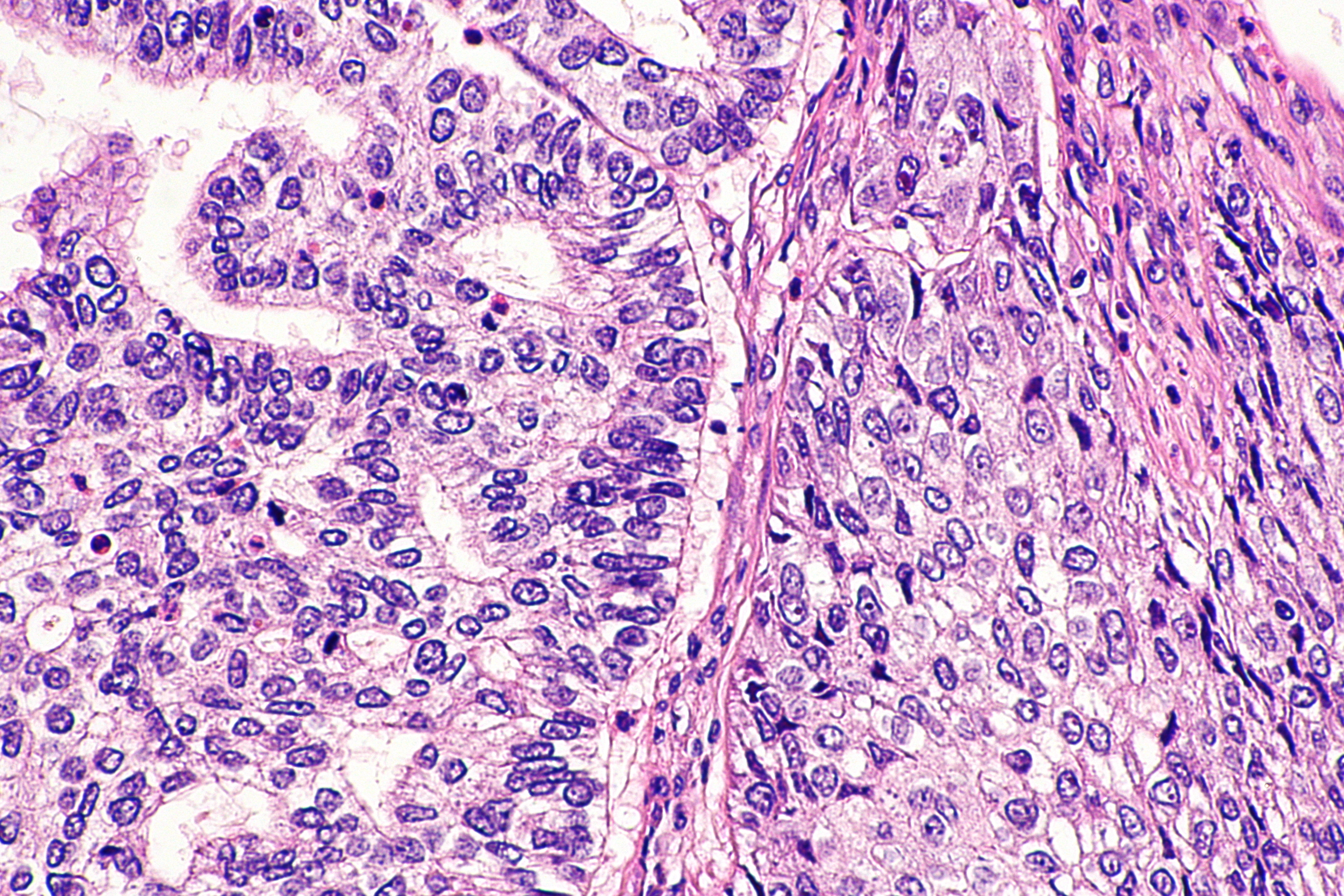
Adenosquamous carcinoma, with glandular features at left and squamous features at right

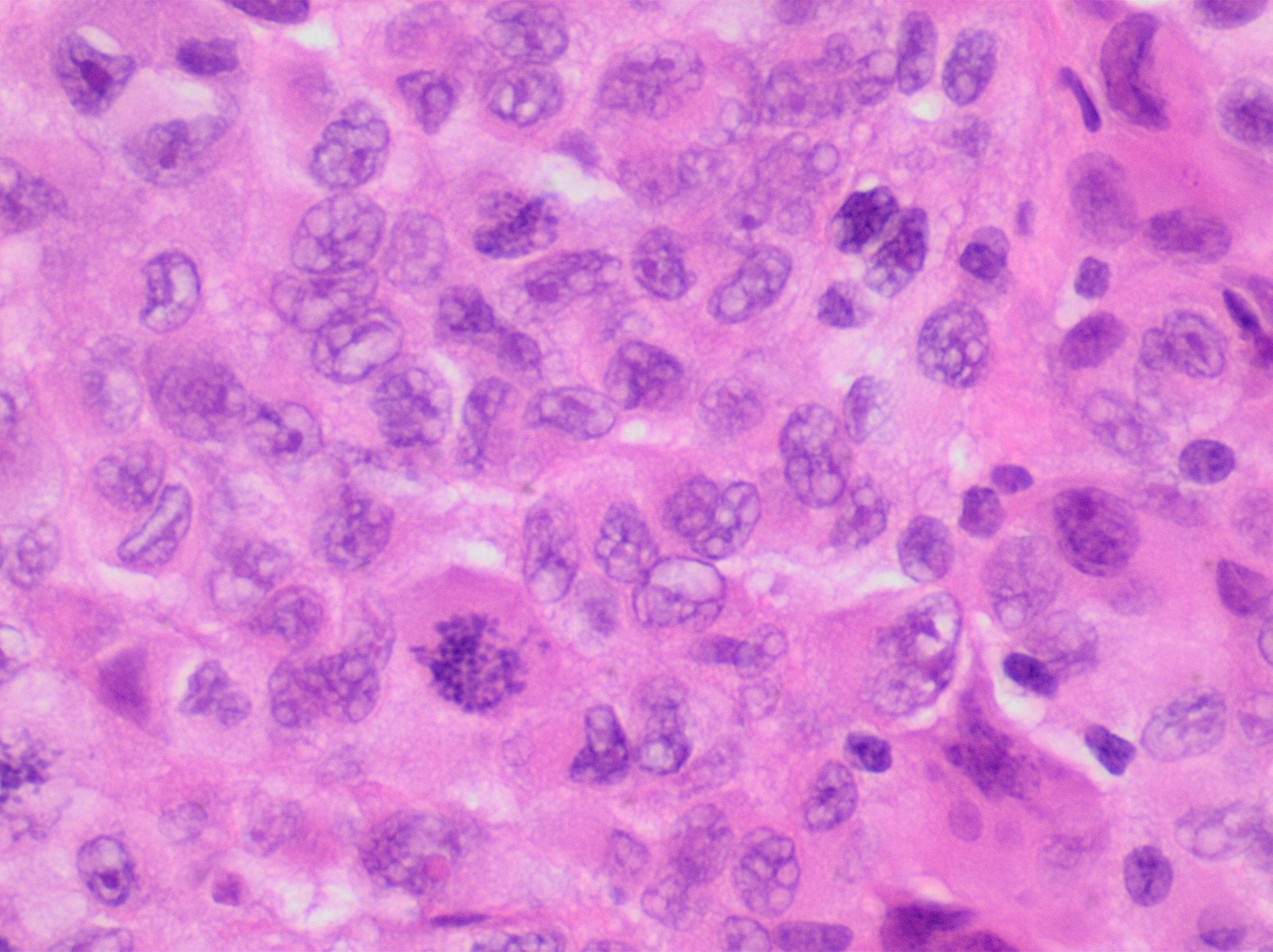
Anaplastic tumor cells

Large cell carcinoma

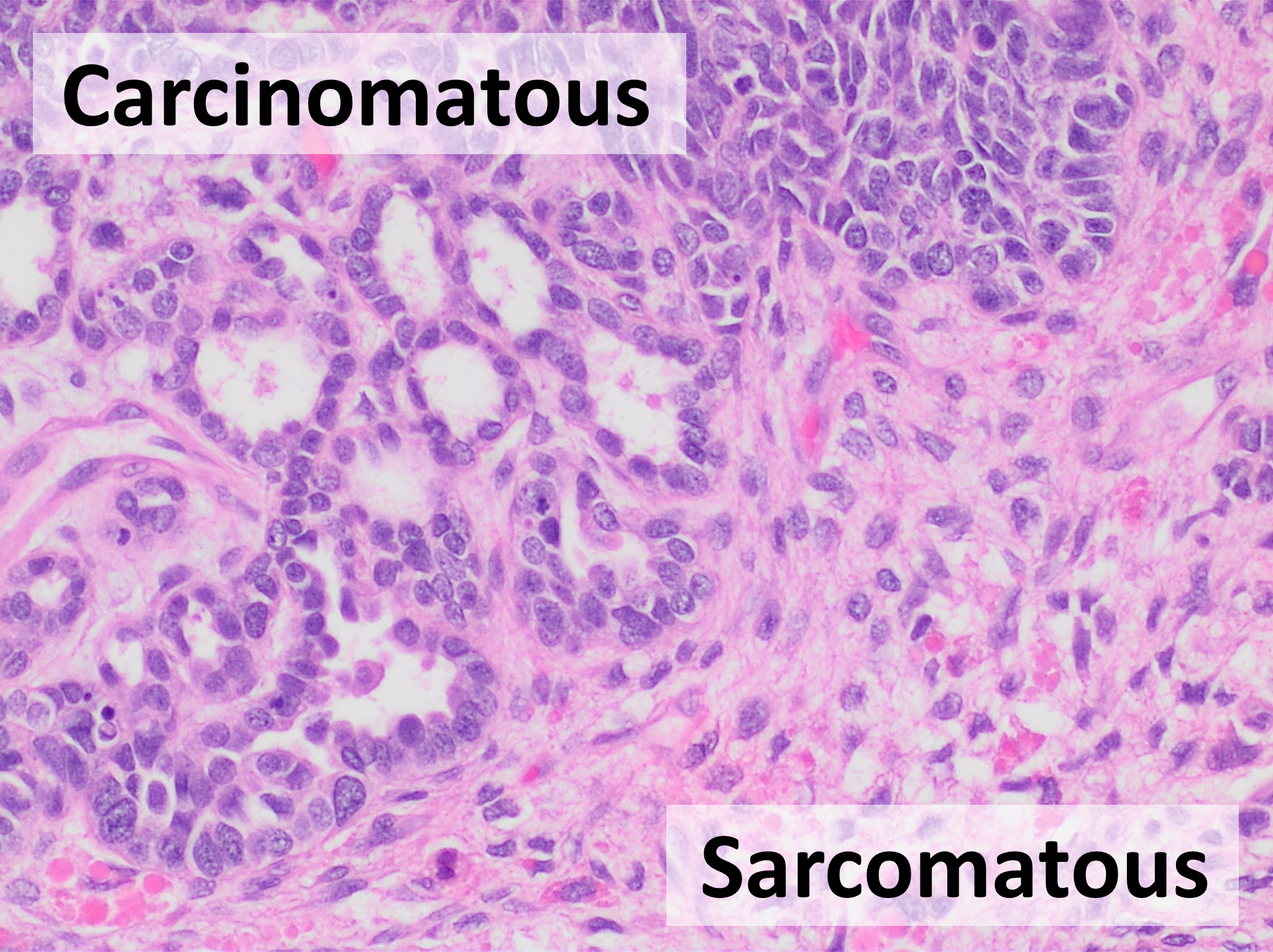
Carcinosarcoma, having mixed carcinomatous and sarcomatous elements

=== Carcinoma of unknown primary site ===
Immunohistochemistry for cytokeratin 7 and cytokeratin 20 can give a clue about possible origins of carcinomas of unknown primary site.

The term carcinoma has also come to encompass malignant tumors composed of transformed cells whose origin or developmental lineage is unknown (see cancer of unknown primary origin; CUP), but that possess certain specific molecular, cellular, and histological characteristics typical of epithelial cells. This may include the production of one or more forms of cytokeratin or other intermediate filaments, intercellular bridge structures, keratin pearls, and/or tissue architectural motifs such as stratification or pseudo-stratification.

=== ICD-10 code ===
- (8010-8045) Epithelial neoplasms, NOS
- (8050-8080) Squamous cell neoplasms
  - (M8070/3) Squamous cell carcinoma, NOS
- (8090-8110) Basal cell neoplasms
  - (M8090/3) Basal cell carcinoma, NOS
- (8120-8130) Transitional cell carcinomas
- (8140-8380) Adenocarcinomas
  - (M8140/3) Adenocarcinoma, NOS
  - (M8142/3) Linitis plastica
  - (M8155/3) Vipoma
  - (M8160/3) Cholangiocarcinoma
  - (M8170/3) Hepatocellular carcinoma, NOS
  - (M8200/3) Adenoid cystic carcinoma
  - (M8312/3) Renal cell carcinoma
  - (M8312/3) Grawitz tumor
- (8390-8420) Adnexal and skin appendage neoplasms
- (8430-8439) Mucoepidermoid neoplasms
- (8440-8490) Cystic, mucinous and serous neoplasms
- (8500-8540) Ductal, lobular and medullary neoplasms
- (8550-8559) Acinar cell neoplasms
- (8560-8580) Complex epithelial neoplasms

=== Carcinoma In situ ===
The term carcinoma in situ (or CIS) is a term for cells that are significantly abnormal but not cancer. They are thus not typically carcinomas.

== Pathogenesis ==
Cancer occurs when a single progenitor cell accumulates mutations and other changes in the DNA, histones, and other biochemical compounds that make up the cell's genome. The cell genome controls the structure of the cell's biochemical components, the biochemical reactions that occur within the cell, and the biological interactions of that cell with other cells. Certain combinations of mutations in the given progenitor cell ultimately result in that cell (also called a cancer stem cell) displaying a number of abnormal, malignant cellular properties that, when taken together, are considered characteristic of cancer, including:

- the ability to continue to divide perpetually, producing an exponentially (or near-exponentially) increasing number of new malignant cancerous "daughter cells" (uncontrolled mitosis);
- the ability to penetrate normal body surfaces and barriers, and to bore into or through nearby body structures and tissues (local invasiveness);
- the ability to spread to other sites within the body (metastasize) by penetrating or entering into the lymphatic vessels (regional metastasis) and/or the blood vessels (distant metastasis).

If this process of continuous growth, local invasion, and regional and distant metastasis is not halted via a combination of stimulation of immunological defenses and medical treatment interventions, the result is that the host has a continuously increasing burden of tumor cells throughout the body. Eventually, the tumor burden increasingly interferes with normal biochemical functions carried out by the host's organs, and death ultimately ensues.

Carcinoma is but one form of cancer—one composed of cells that have developed the cytological appearance, histological architecture, or molecular characteristics of epithelial cells. A progenitor carcinoma stem cell can be formed from any of a number of oncogenic combinations of mutations in a totipotent cell, a multipotent cell, or a mature differentiated cell.

=== Metastatic carcinoma ===
Metastatic carcinoma is cancer that is able to grow at sites distant from the primary site of origin; thus, dissemination to the skin may occur with any malignant neoplasm, and these infiltrates may result from direct invasion of the skin from underlying tumors, may extend by lymphatic or hematogenous spread, or may be introduced by therapeutic procedures.

=== Mutation ===
Whole genome sequencing has established the mutation frequency for whole human genomes. The mutation frequency in the whole genome between generations for humans (parent to child) is about 70 new mutations per generation.

Carcinomas, however, have much higher mutation frequencies. The particular frequency depends on tissue type, whether a mis-match DNA repair deficiency is present, and exposure to DNA damaging agents such as components of tobacco smoke. Tuna and Amos have summarized the mutation frequencies per megabase (Mb) in some carcinomas, as shown in the table (along with the indicated frequencies of mutations per genome).

Mutation frequencies
Cell type	Mutation frequency	
Cell type	Per megabase	Per diploid genome
Germline	0.023	70
Prostate cancer	0.9	5,400
Colorectal carcinoma	~5	~30,000
Microsatellite stable (MSS) colon cancer	2.8	16,800
Microsatellite instable (MSI) colon cancer (mismatch repair deficient)	47	282,000
Hepatocellular carcinoma	4.2	25,200
Breast cancer	1.18–1.66	7,080–9,960
Lung cancer	17.7	106,200
Small cell lung cancer	7.4	44,400
Non-small cell lung cancer (smokers)	10.5	63,000
Non-small cell lung cancer (never-smokers)	0.6	3,600
Lung adenocarcinoma (smokers)	9.8	58,500
Lung adenocarcinoma (never-smokers)	1.7	10,200

==== Cause of mutations ====
The likely major underlying cause of mutations in carcinomas is DNA damage. For example, in the case of lung cancer, DNA damage is caused by agents in exogenous genotoxic tobacco smoke (e.g. acrolein, formaldehyde, acrylonitrile, 1,3-butadiene, acetaldehyde, ethylene oxide and isoprene). Endogenous (metabolically caused) DNA damage is also very frequent, occurring on average more than 60,000 times a day in the genomes of human cells. Externally and endogenously caused damages may be converted into mutations by inaccurate translesion synthesis or inaccurate DNA repair (e.g. by non-homologous end joining).

===== High frequency =====
The high frequency of mutations in the total genome within carcinomas suggests that, often, an early carcinogenic alteration may be a deficiency in DNA repair. For instance, mutation rates substantially increase (sometimes by 100-fold) in cells defective in DNA mismatch repair.

A deficiency in DNA repair, itself, can allow DNA damages to accumulate, and error-prone translesion synthesis past some of those damages may give rise to mutations. In addition, faulty repair of these accumulated DNA damages may give rise to epigenetic alterations or epimutations. While a mutation or epimutation in a DNA repair gene, itself, would not confer a selective advantage, such a repair defect may be carried along as a passenger in a cell when the cell acquires an additional mutation/epimutation that does provide a proliferative advantage. Such cells, with both proliferative advantages and one or more DNA repair defects (causing a very high mutation rate), likely give rise to the high frequency of total genome mutations seen in carcinomas.

==== DNA repair ====
In somatic cells, deficiencies in DNA repair sometimes arise by mutations in DNA repair genes, but much more often are due to epigenetic reductions in expression of DNA repair genes. Thus, in a sequence of 113 colorectal carcinomas, only four had somatic missense mutations in the DNA repair gene MGMT, while the majority of these cancers had reduced MGMT protein expression due to methylation of the MGMT promoter region.

== Diagnosis ==
Carcinomas can be definitively diagnosed through biopsy, including fine-needle aspiration (FNA), core biopsy, or subtotal removal of single node. Microscopic examination by a pathologist is then necessary to identify molecular, cellular, or tissue architectural characteristics of epithelial cells.

=== Types ===
- Oral: Most oral cancers are squamous-cell carcinoma
- Lung: Carcinoma comprises >98% of all lung cancers.
- Breast: Nearly all breast cancers are ductal carcinoma.
- Prostate: The most common form of carcinoma of the prostate is adenocarcinoma.
- Colon and rectum: Nearly all malignancies of the colon and rectum are either adenocarcinoma or squamous cell carcinoma.
- Pancreas: Pancreatic carcinoma is almost always of the adenocarcinoma type and is highly lethal.
- Ovaries: One of the most deadly forms due to late detection.

Some carcinomas are named for their or the putative cell of origin, (e.g.hepatocellular carcinoma, renal cell carcinoma).

=== Staging ===
Staging of carcinoma refers to the process of combining physical/clinical examination, pathological review of cells and tissues, surgical techniques, laboratory tests, and imaging studies in a logical fashion to obtain information about the size of the neoplasm and the extent of its invasion and metastasis. Carcinoma stage is the variable that has been most consistently and tightly linked to the prognosis of the malignancy.

Carcinomas are usually staged with Roman numerals. In most classifications, Stage I and Stage II carcinomas are confirmed when the tumor has been found to be small and/or to have spread to local structures only. Stage III carcinomas typically have been found to have spread to regional lymph nodes, tissues, and/or organ structures, while Stage IV tumors have already metastasized through the blood to distant sites, tissues, or organs.

In some types of carcinomas, Stage 0 carcinoma has been used to describe carcinoma in situ, and occult carcinomas detectable only via examination of sputum for malignant cells (in lung carcinomas).

In more recent staging systems, substages (a, b, c) are becoming more commonly used to better define groups of patients with similar prognosis or treatment options.

The criteria for staging can differ dramatically based upon the organ system in which the tumor arises. For example, the colon and bladder cancer staging system relies on depth of invasion, staging of breast carcinoma is more dependent on the size of the tumor, and in renal carcinoma, staging is based on both the size of the tumor and the depth of the tumor invasion into the renal sinus. Carcinoma of the lung has a more complicated staging system, taking into account a number of size and anatomic variables.

The UICC/AJCC TNM systems are most often used. For some common tumors, however, classical staging methods (such as the Dukes classification for colon cancer) are still used.

=== Grading ===
Grading of carcinomas refers to the employment of criteria intended to semi-quantify the degree of cellular and tissue maturity seen in the transformed cells relative to the appearance of the normal parent epithelial tissue from which the carcinoma derives.

Grading of carcinoma is most often done after a treating physician and/or surgeon obtains a sample of suspected tumor tissue using surgical resection, needle or surgical biopsy, direct washing or brushing of tumor tissue, sputum cytopathology, etc. A pathologist then examines the tumor and its stroma, perhaps utilizing staining, immunohistochemistry, flow cytometry, or other methods. Finally, the pathologist classifies the tumor semi-quantitatively into one of three or four grades, including:

- Grade 1, or well differentiated: there is a close, or very close, resemblance to the normal parent tissue, and the tumor cells are easily identified and classified as a particular malignant histological entity;
- Grade 2, or moderately differentiated: there is considerable resemblance to the parent cells and tissues, but abnormalities can commonly be seen and the more complex features are not particularly well-formed;
- Grade 3, or poorly differentiated: there is very little resemblance between the malignant tissue and the normal parent tissue, abnormalities are evident, and the more complex architectural features are usually rudimentary or primitive;
- Grade 4, or undifferentiated carcinoma: these carcinomas bear no significant resemblance to the corresponding parent cells and tissues, with no visible formation of glands, ducts, bridges, stratified layers, keratin pearls, or other notable characteristics consistent with a more highly differentiated neoplasm.

Although there is definite and convincing statistical correlation between carcinoma grade and tumor prognosis for some tumor types and sites of origin, the strength of this association can be highly variable. It may be stated generally, however, that the higher the grade of the lesion, the worse is its prognosis.

== Epidemiology ==
While cancer is generally considered a disease of old age, children can also develop cancer. In contrast to adults, carcinomas are exceptionally rare in children. Less than 1% of carcinoma diagnoses are in children.

The two biggest risk factors for ovarian carcinoma are age and family history.
