= Segmental resection =

Type of surgical procedure to remove an organ or gland

Segmental resection, or segmentectomy, is a surgical procedure to remove part of an organ or gland as a sub-type of resection, which might involve removing the whole body part. It may also be used to remove a tumor and the normal tissue around it. In lung cancer surgery, segmental resection refers to removing a section of a lobe of the lung. The resection margin needed to be free of cancerous cells.
