= Adenosquamous carcinoma =

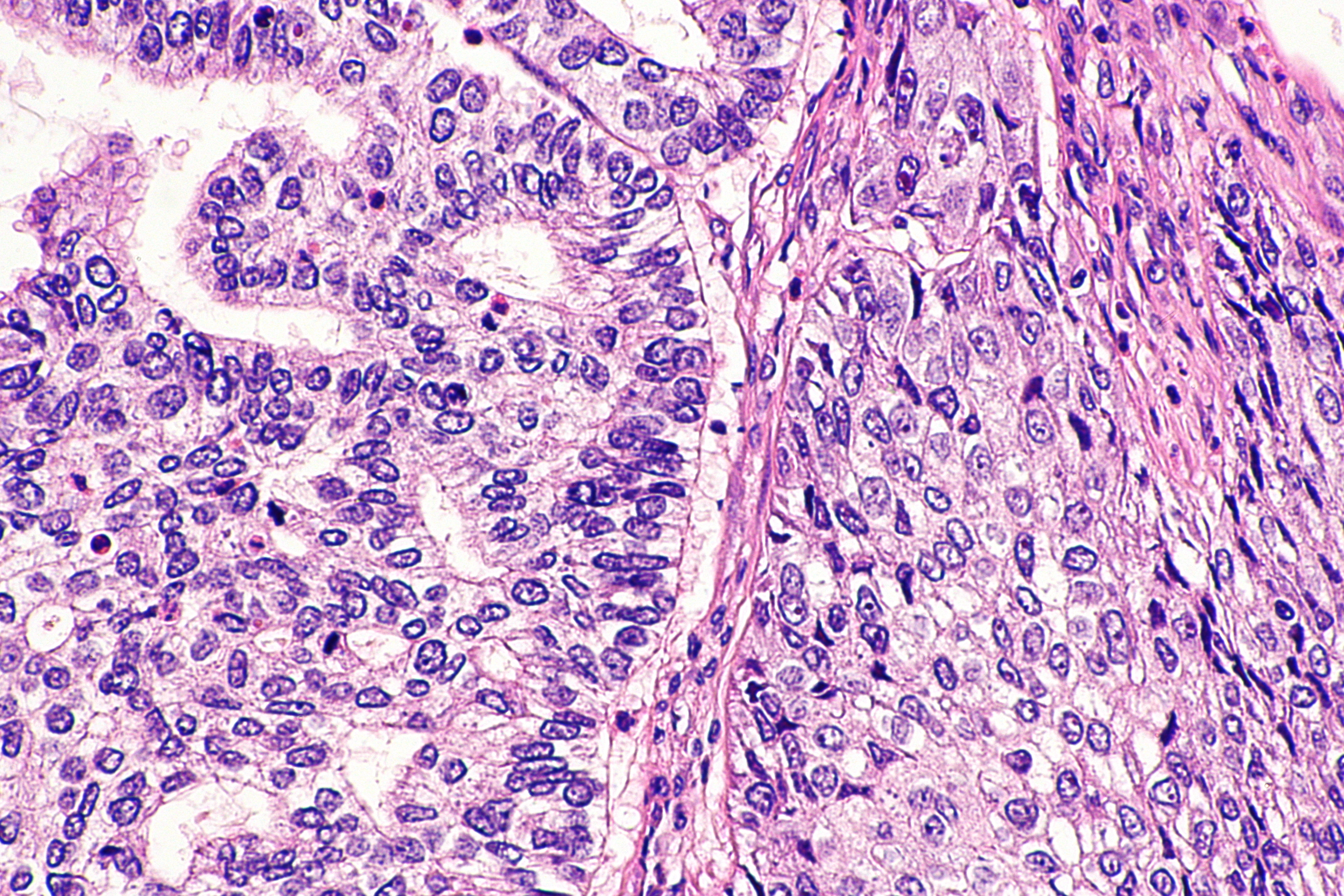
- Micrograph of an adenosquamous carcinoma of the lung. The adeno- or glandular component is on the left of the image and the squamous component on the right of the image. H&E stain.
- Specialty: Oncology

Adenosquamous carcinoma is a type of cancer that contains two types of cells: squamous cells (thin, flat cells that line certain organs) and gland-like cells. It has been associated with more aggressive characteristics when compared to adenocarcinoma in certain cancers. It is responsible for 1% to 4% of exocrine forms of pancreas cancer.

== Diagnosis ==
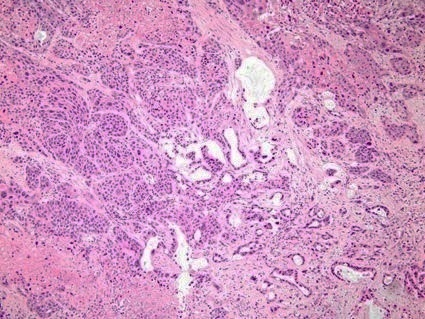
Micrograph of adenosquamous carcinoma of the pancreas.

Light microscopy shows a combination of gland-like cells and squamous epithelial cells. On immunohistochemistry, it is typically positive for CK5/6, CK7 and p63, and negative for CK20, p16 and p53. On genetic testing, KRAS and p53 are typically altered.
