= Spindle cell carcinoma =

- Specialty: Oncology

Spindle cell carcinoma is a type of cancer that begins in the skin or in tissues that line or cover internal organs and that contains long spindle-shaped cells. It is also called sarcomatoid carcinoma.

== See also ==
- Spindle cell sarcoma
- Spindle cell squamous cell carcinoma
