= Pleuropulmonary blastoma =

- Other names: Pulmonary blastoma
- Specialty: Oncology

Pleuropulmonary blastoma (PPB) is a rare cancer originating in the lung or pleural cavity. It occurs most often in infants and young children but also has been reported in adults. In a retrospective review of 204 children with lung tumors, pleuropulmonary blastoma and carcinoid tumor were the most common primary tumors (83% of the 204 children had secondary tumors spread from cancers elsewhere in the body). Pleuropulmonary blastoma is regarded as malignant. The male:female ratio is approximately one.

== Signs and symptoms ==
Symptoms may include coughing, an upper respiratory tract infection, shortness of breath, and chest pain. These symptoms are very non-specific, and can be caused by other types of tumor in the lung or mediastinum more generally, and by other conditions. Imaging (X-ray, CT, MRI) may be used to determine the presence and precise location of a tumor, but not a specific diagnosis of PPB or other tumor. Doctors are unable to tell if a child has PPB right away, and not upper respiratory tract infection, until more tests are taken and they show that there is no infection. Another symptom is pneumothorax.

== Genetics ==
A number of PPBs have shown trisomy 8 (17 out of 23 cases studied per the PPB registry). Trisomy 2 and p53 mutations/deletions have also been described.

An association with mutations in the DICER1 gene has been reported. Mutations in this gene are found in 2/3 cases.

== Diagnosis ==
The most common way to test someone for PPB is to take a biopsy. Other tests like x-rays, CAT scans, and MRI's can suggest that cancer is present, but only an examination of a piece of the tumor can make a definite diagnosis.

=== Types ===
Pleuropulmonary blastoma is classified into 3 types:

- Type I is multicystic
- Type II shows thickening areas (nodules) within this cystic lesion
- Type III shows solid masses.

Type I PPB is made up of mostly cysts, and may be hard to distinguish from benign lung cysts, and there is some evidence that not all type I PPB will progress to types II and III. Types II and III are aggressive, and cerebral metastasis is more frequent in PPB than in other childhood sarcomas.

== Treatment ==
Treating PPB depends on the size and location of the tumor, whether the cancer has spread, and the child's overall health. Surgery is the main treatment for PPB. The main goal of surgery is to remove the tumor. If the tumor is too large to be completely removed, or if it's not possible to completely remove the tumor, surgery may be performed after chemotherapy. Because PPB can return after treatment, regular screening for possible recurrence should continue for 48 to 60 months, after diagnosis.

== History ==
Pleuropulmonary blastoma was first described in 1988.

An international registry has been established.

== See also ==
- Lung cancer
