= Large-cell lung carcinoma =

Large-cell carcinoma
- Specialty: Oncology/pulmonology

Large-Cell Lung Carcinoma (LCLC), or Large-Cell Carcinoma (LCC) in short, is a heterogeneous group of undifferentiated malignant neoplasms that lack the cytology and architectural features of small cell carcinoma and glandular or squamous differentiation. LCC is categorized as a type of NSCLC (non-small-cell lung carcinoma) that originates from the epithelial cells of the lung. LCLC is histologically characterized by the presence of large, undifferentiated cells that lack distinctive features of either squamous cell carcinoma or adenocarcinoma (other types of cancers). Typically seen in LCLC, tumor cells have abundant pale-staining cytoplasm and prominent nucleoli.

== Presentation ==
The clinical presentation of LCLC is nonspecific and can include symptoms such as:

1. Persistent cough
2. Shortness of breath/pain with breathing
3. Chest pain
4. Unintentional weight loss
5. General fatigue
6. Coughing up blood (hemoptysis)
7. Frequent upper respiratory infections (URIs)
8. Difficulty swallowing
9. Hoarseness

== Diagnosis ==
LCC is, in effect, a "diagnosis of exclusion", in that the tumor cells lack light microscopic characteristics that would classify the neoplasm as a small-cell carcinoma, squamous-cell carcinoma, adenocarcinoma, or other more specific histologic type of lung cancer.

Tools used for diagnosis:

Imaging Studies: Chest X-rays, CT scans, PET, or PET-CT scans are the most commonly used imaging modalities to help identify the size, location, and extent of the tumor.

Biopsy: Done by obtaining a piece of tissue from the tumor, classically done through bronchoscopy or CT guided needle biopsy, to study the histology of the tissue and confirm diagnosis.

=== Classification ===
The newest revisions of the World Health Organization (WHO) "Histological Typing of Lung Cancer schema" include several variants of LCC, including:

- large cell neuroendocrine carcinoma
- basaloid carcinoma
- lymphoepithelioma-like carcinoma
- clear cell carcinoma
- large cell carcinoma with rhabdoid phenotype.

==== Large-cell neuroendocrine carcinoma (LCNEC) ====
One clinically significant subtype is "large-cell neuroendocrine carcinoma" (LCNEC), which is believed to derive from neuroendocrine cells.

In addition, a "subvariant", called "combined large-cell neuroendocrine carcinoma" (or c-LCNEC), is recognized under the new system. To be designated a c-LCNEC, the tumor must contain at least 10% LCNEC cells, in combination with at least 10% of other forms of NSCLC.

==== Pathology images ====
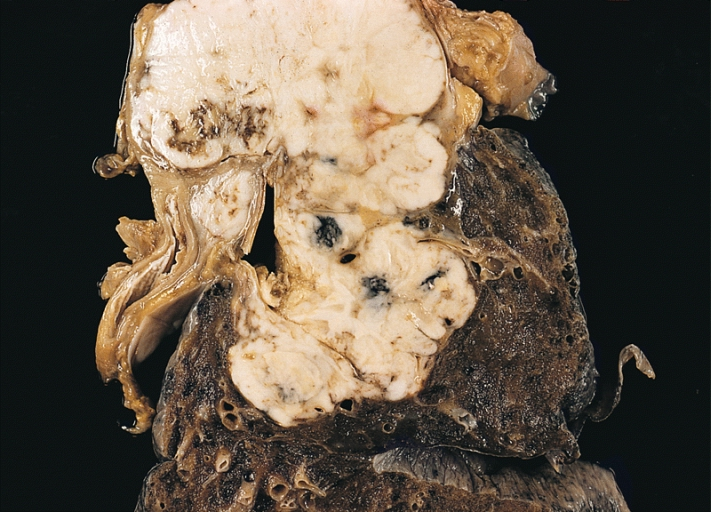

== Incidence ==
Pie chart showing incidence of large-cell lung cancer (shown in green at upper left) as compared to other lung cancer types, with fractions of smokers versus non-smokers shown for each type.

In most series, LCLC's comprise between 3–9% of all primary lung cancers.

According to the Nurses' Health Study, the risk of large cell lung carcinoma increases with a previous history of tobacco smoking, with a previous smoking duration of 30 to 40 years giving a relative risk of approximately 2.3 compared to never-smokers, and a duration of more than 40 years giving a relative risk of approximately 3.6.

Another study concluded that cigarette smoking is the predominant cause of large cell lung cancer. It estimated that the odds ratio associated with smoking two or more packs per day for current smokers is 37.0 in men and 72.9 in women.

Notable people with the condition include American comedian Andy Kaufman, who died from the disease in 1984.

== Treatment options ==
Treatment often requires a multidisciplinary approach, which will vary based on factors such as the extent of the tumor and the condition and comorbidities of the patient.

1. Surgery: Surgical resection may be considered for local tumors.
2. Chemotherapy: Standard treatment of LCLC. Often use of platinum-based agents with other cytotoxic drugs are used to target the tumor. Due to overall prognosis chemotherapy often may offer increased chance to improve survival.
3. Targeted Therapy: A type of treatment that targets specific features of the cell to minimize damaging healthy cells and to reduce side effects of the treatment.
4. Immunotherapy: A form of treatment that boosts the body's natural immune defense system to apprehend the cancer cells.
