= Sweat gland =

Small sweat-producing tubular skin structures

- A cross-section of the human skin, with the sweat gland labeled at the bottom

Details
- Precursor: Ectoderm
- System: Integumentary
- Nerve: Eccrine: cholinergic sympathetic nerves Apocrine: adrenergic nerves

Identifiers
- Latin: glandula sudorifera
- MeSH: D013545
- TA98: A16.0.00.029
- TA2: 7079
- FMA: 59152

Sweat glands, also known as sudoriferous or sudoriparous glands, from Latin sudor 'sweat', are small tubular structures of the skin that produce sweat. Sweat glands are a type of exocrine gland, which are glands that produce and secrete substances onto an epithelial surface by way of a duct. There are two main types of sweat glands that differ in their structure, function, secretory product, mechanism of excretion, anatomic distribution, and distribution across species:

- Eccrine sweat glands are distributed almost all over the human body, in varying densities, with the highest density in palms and soles, then on the head, but much less on the trunk and the extremities. Their water-based secretion represents a primary form of cooling in humans.
- Apocrine sweat glands are mostly limited to the axillae (armpits) and perineal area in humans. They are not significant for cooling in humans, but are the sole effective sweat glands in hoofed animals, such as the camels, donkeys, horses, and cattle.

Ceruminous glands (which produce ear wax), mammary glands (which produce milk), and ciliary glands in the eyelids are modified apocrine sweat glands.

== Structure ==
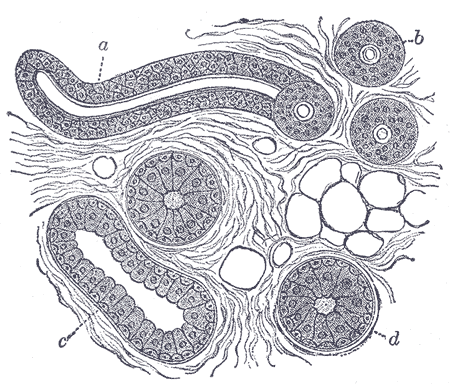
Body of a sweat gland cut in various directions

Generally, sweat glands consist of a secretory unit that produces sweat, and a duct that carries the sweat away. The secretory coil or base, is set deep in the lower dermis and hypodermis, and the entire gland is surrounded by adipose tissue. In both sweat gland types, the secretory coils are surrounded by contractile myoepithelial cells that function to facilitate excretion of secretory product. The secretory activities of the gland cells and the contractions of myoepithelial cells are controlled by both the autonomic nervous system and by the circulating hormones. The distal or apical part of the duct that opens to the skin's surface is known as the acrosyringium.

Each sweat gland receives several nerve fibers that branch out into bands of one or more axons and encircle the individual tubules of the secretory coil. Capillaries are also interwoven among sweat tubules.

Differences Between Eccrine & Apocrine Sweat Glands
	Eccrine Glands	Apocrine Glands
Overall diameter of secretory coil	500-700 μm	800 μm
Diameter of individual secretory tubule	30-40 μm	80-100 μm
Composition of secretory epithelium	single layer, mixed clear cells & dark cells	single layer columnar cells
Composition of ductal epithelium	two or more layers of cuboidal cells	double layer of cuboidal cells
Duct opens to	skin surface	hair follicle, sometimes nearby skin surface

== Distribution ==
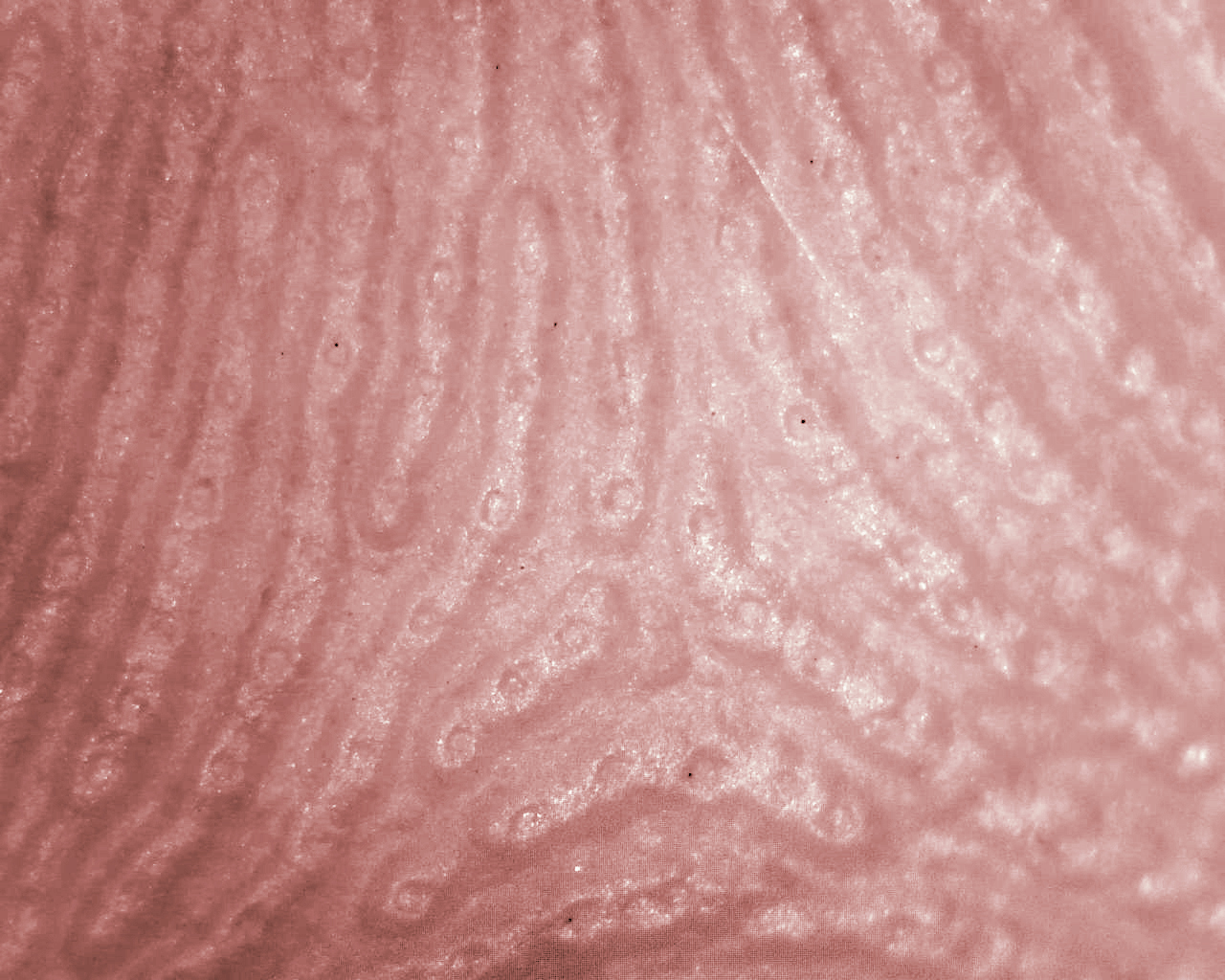
Human sweat gland pores on the ridges of a finger pad

The number of active sweat glands varies greatly among different people, though comparisons between different areas (ex. axillae vs. groin) show the same directional changes (certain areas always have more active sweat glands while others always have fewer). According to Henry Gray's estimates, the palm has around 370 sweat glands per cm^{2}; the back of the hand has 200 per cm^{2}; the forehead has 175 per cm^{2}; the breast, abdomen, and forearm have 155 per cm^{2}; and the back and legs have 60–80 per cm^{2}.

In the finger pads, sweat glands pores are somewhat irregularly spaced on the epidermal ridges. There are no pores between the ridges, though sweat tends to spill into them. The thick epidermis of the palms and soles causes the sweat glands to become spirally coiled.

=== Other animals ===
Non-primate mammals have eccrine sweat glands only on the palms and soles. Apocrine glands cover the rest of the body, though they are not as effective as humans' in temperature regulation (with the exception of horses'). Prosimians have a 1:20 ratio of follicles with apocrine glands versus follicles without. They have eccrine glands between hairs over most of their body (while humans have them between the hairs on their scalp).

The overall distribution of sweat glands varies among primates: the rhesus and patas monkeys have them on the chest; the squirrel monkey has them only on the palms and soles; and the stump-tailed macaque, Japanese monkey, and baboon have them over the entire body.

Domestic animals have apocrine glands at the base of each hair follicle, but eccrine glands only in foot pads and snout. Their apocrine glands, like those in humans, produce an odorless oily milky secretion evolved, not to evaporate and cool, but rather to coat and stick to hair so that odor-causing bacteria could grow on it. Likewise, glands on their foot pads, like those on the palms and soles of humans, did not evolve to cool, but rather to increase friction and enhance grip.

Dogs and cats have apocrine glands that are specialized in both structure and function located at the eyelids (Moll's glands), ears (ceruminous glands), anal sac, clitoral hood, and circumanal area.

== History ==
The pores of eccrine sweat pores were first identified by the Italian physiologist Marcello Malpighi. Sweat glands themselves were first discovered by the Czech physiologist, Johannes Purkinjé in 1833. The differing densities of sweat glands in different body regions was first investigated in 1844 by the German anatomist Karl Krause. Sweat glands were first separated into kinds by the French histologist Louis-Antoine Ranvier, who separated them in 1887 regarding their type of secretion into holocrine glands (sebaceous glands) and the merocrine glands (sweat glands), the latter were then in 1917 divided into apocrine and eccrine sweat glands. In 1987, apoeccrine glands were identified.

== Types ==
=== Eccrine ===
Eccrine sweat glands are everywhere except the lips, ear canal, foreskin, glans penis, labia minora, clitoral hood, and clitoris. They are ten times smaller than apocrine sweat glands, do not extend as deeply into the dermis, and excrete directly onto the surface of the skin. The proportion of eccrine glands decreases with age.

The clear secretion produced by eccrine sweat glands is termed sweat or sensible perspiration. Sweat is mostly water, but it does contain some electrolytes, since it is derived from blood plasma. The presence of sodium chloride gives sweat a salty taste.

The total volume of sweat produced depends on the number of functional glands and the size of the surface opening. The degree of secretory activity is regulated by neural and hormonal mechanisms (men sweat more than women). When all of the eccrine sweat glands are working at maximum capacity, the rate of perspiration for a human being may exceed three liters per hour, and dangerous losses of fluids and electrolytes can occur.

Eccrine glands have three primary functions:

- Thermoregulation: sweat (through evaporation and evaporative heat loss) can lead to cooling of the surface of the skin and a reduction of body temperature.
- Excretion: eccrine sweat gland secretion can also provide a significant excretory route for water and electrolytes.
- Protection: eccrine sweat gland secretion aids in preserving the skin's acid mantle, which helps protect the skin from colonization by bacteria and other pathogenic organisms.

=== Apocrine ===
Apocrine sweat glands are found in the armpit, areola (around the nipples), perineum (between the anus and genitals), in the ear, and the eyelids. The secretory portion is larger than that of eccrine glands (making them larger overall). Rather than opening directly onto the surface of the skin, apocrine glands secrete sweat into the pilary canal of the hair follicle.

Before puberty, the apocrine sweat glands are inactive; hormonal changes in puberty cause the glands to increase in size and begin functioning. The substance secreted is thicker than eccrine sweat and provides nutrients for bacteria on the skin: the bacteria's decomposition of sweat is what creates the acrid odor. Apocrine sweat glands are most active in times of stress and sexual excitement.

In mammals (including humans), apocrine sweat contains pheromone-like compounds to attract other organisms within their species. Study of human sweat has revealed differences between men and women in apocrine secretions and bacteria.

=== Apoeccrine ===
Some human sweat glands cannot be classified as either apocrine or eccrine, having characteristics of both; such glands are termed apoeccrine. They are larger than eccrine glands, but smaller than apocrine glands. Their secretory portion has a narrow portion similar to secretory coils in eccrine glands as well as a wide section reminiscent of apocrine glands.

Apoeccrine glands, found in the armpits and perianal region, have ducts opening onto the skin surface. They are presumed to have developed in puberty from the eccrine glands, and can comprise up to 50% of all axillary glands. Apoeccrine glands secrete more sweat than both eccrine and apocrine glands, thus playing a large role in axillary sweating. Apoeccrine glands are sensitive to cholinergic activity, though they can also be activated via adrenergic stimulation. Like eccrine glands, they continuously secrete a thin, watery sweat.

=== Others ===
Specialized sweat glands, including the ceruminous glands, mammary glands, ciliary glands of the eyelids, and sweat glands of the nasal vestibulum, are modified apocrine glands. Ceruminous glands are near the ear canals, and produce cerumen (earwax) that mixes with the oil secreted from sebaceous glands. Mammary glands use apocrine secretion to produce milk.

== Sweat ==
Sweat glands are used to regulate temperature and remove waste by secreting water, sodium salts, and nitrogenous waste (such as urea) onto the skin surface. The main electrolytes of sweat are sodium and chloride, though the amount is small enough to make sweat hypotonic at the skin surface. Eccrine sweat is clear, odorless, and is composed of 98–99% water; it also contains NaCl, fatty acids, lactic acid, citric acid, ascorbic acid, urea, and uric acid. Its pH ranges from 4 to 6.8. On the other hand, the apocrine sweat has a pH of 6 to 7.5; it contains water, proteins, carbohydrate waste material, lipids, and steroids. The sweat is oily, cloudy, viscous, and originally odorless; it gains odor upon decomposition by bacteria. Because both apocrine glands and sebaceous glands open into the hair follicle, apocrine sweat is mixed with sebum.

=== Mechanism ===
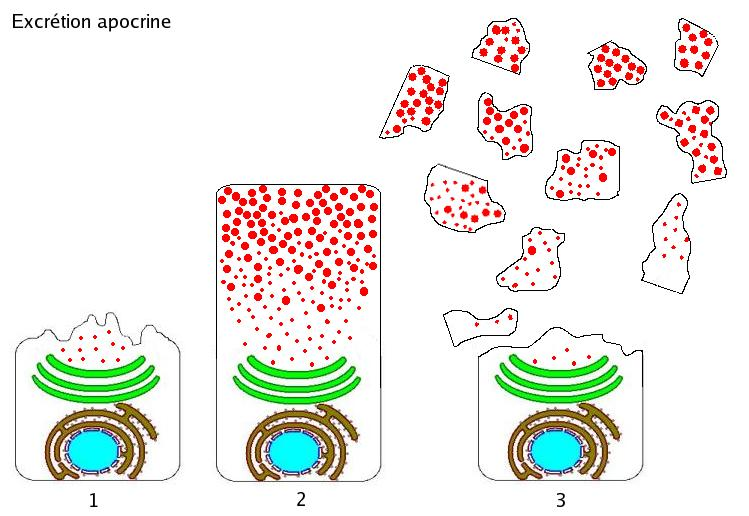
In apocrine secretion (pictured), portions of the cell are pinched off and later disintegrate.

Both apocrine and eccrine sweat glands use merocrine secretion, where vesicles in the gland release sweat via exocytosis, leaving the entire cell intact. It was originally thought that apocrine sweat glands use apocrine secretion due to histological artifacts resembling "blebs" on the cell surface, however, recent electron micrographs indicate that the cells use merocrine secretion. In both apocrine and eccrine sweat glands, the sweat is originally produced in the gland's coil, where it is isotonic with the blood plasma there. When the rate of sweating is low, salt is conserved and reabsorbed by the gland's duct; high sweat rates, on the other hand, lead to less salt reabsorption and allow more water to evaporate on the skin (via osmosis) to increase evaporative cooling.

Secretion of sweat occurs when the myoepithelial cell cells surrounding the secretory glands contract. Eccrine sweat increases the rate of bacterial growth and volatilizes the odor compounds of apocrine sweat, strengthening the latter's acrid smell.

Normally, only a certain number of sweat glands are actively producing sweat. When stimuli call for more sweating, more sweat glands are activated, with each then producing more sweat.

=== Stimuli ===
==== Thermal ====
Both eccrine and apocrine sweat glands participate in thermoregulatory sweating, which is directly controlled by the hypothalamus. Thermal sweating is stimulated by a combination of internal body temperature and mean skin temperature. In eccrine sweat glands, stimulation occurs via activation by acetylcholine, which binds to the gland's muscarinic receptors.

==== Emotional ====
Emotional sweating is stimulated by stress, anxiety, fear, and pain; it is independent of ambient temperature. Acetylcholine acts on the eccrine glands and adrenaline acts on both eccrine and apocrine glands to produce sweat. Emotional sweating can occur anywhere, though it is most evident on the palms, soles of the feet, and axillary regions. Sweating on the palms and soles is thought to have evolved as a fleeing reaction in mammals: it increases friction and prevents slipping when running or climbing in stressful situations.

==== Gustatory ====
Gustatory sweating refers to thermal sweating induced by the ingestion of food. The increase in metabolism caused by ingestion raises body temperature, leading to thermal sweating. Hot and spicy foods also lead to mild gustatory sweating in the face, scalp and neck: capsaicin (the compound that makes spicy food taste "hot"), binds to receptors in the mouth that detect warmth. The increased stimulation of such receptors induces a thermoregulatory response.

=== Antiperspirant ===
Unlike deodorant, which simply reduces axillary odor without affecting body functions, antiperspirant reduces both eccrine and apocrine sweating. Antiperspirants, which are classified as drugs, cause proteins to precipitate and mechanically block eccrine (and sometimes apocrine) sweat ducts. The metal salts found in antiperspirants alters the keratin fibrils in the ducts; the ducts then close and form a "horny plug". The main active ingredients in modern antiperspirants are aluminum chloride, aluminum chlorohydrate, aluminum zirconium chlorohydrate, and buffered aluminum sulfate.

On apocrine glands, antiperspirants also contain antibacterial agents such as trichlorocarbanilide, hexamethylene tetramine, and zinc ricinoleate. The salts are dissolved in ethanol and mixed with essential oils high in eugenol and thymol (such as thyme and clove oils). Antiperspirants may also contain levomethamphetamine.

== Pathology ==
Some diseases of the sweat glands include:

Fox-Fordyce disease
The apocrine sweat glands become inflamed, causing a persistent, itchy rash, usually in the axillae and pubic areas.
Frey's Syndrome
If the auriculotemporal nerve is damaged (most often as a result of a Parotidectomy), excess sweat can be produced in the rear of the cheek area (just below the ear) in response to stimuli that cause salivation.
Heatstroke
When the eccrine glands become exhausted and unable to secrete sweat. Heatstroke can lead to fatal hyperpyrexia (extreme rise in body temperature).
Hidradenitis suppurativa
Occurs when the skin and sweat glands become inflamed with swollen lumps. These are typically painful and break open, releasing fluid or pus. The most commonly affected areas are the underarms, under the breasts, and the groin.
Hyperhidrosis
(also known as polyhidrosis or sudorrhea) is a pathological, excessive sweating that can be either generalized or localized (focal hyperhidrosis); focal hyperhidrosis occurs most often on the palms, soles, face, scalp and axillae. Hyperhidrosis is usually brought on by emotional or thermal stress, but it can also occur or with little to no stimulus. Local (or asymmetrical) hyperhidrosis is said to be caused by problems in the sympathetic nervous system: either lesions or nerve inflammation. Hyperhidrosis can also be caused by trench foot or encephalitis.
Miliaria rubra
Also called prickly heat. Miliaria rubra is the rupture of sweat glands and migration of sweat to other tissues. In hot environments, the skin's horny layer can expand due to sweat retention, blocking the ducts of eccrine sweat glands. The glands, still stimulated by high temperatures, continues to secrete. Sweat builds up in the duct, causing enough pressure to rupture the duct where it meets the epidermis. Sweat also escapes the duct to adjacent tissues (a process called miliaria). Hypohydrosis then follows miliaria (postmiliarial hypohydrosis).
Osmidrosis
Often called bromhidrosis, especially in combination with hyperhidrosis. Osmohidrosis is excessive odor from apocrine sweat glands (which are overactive in the axillae). Osmidrosis is thought to be caused by changes in the apocrine gland structure rather than changes in the bacteria that acts on sweat.

=== Tumors ===
Sweat gland tumors include:

- Acrospiroma
- Aggressive digital papillary adenocarcinoma
- Apocrine gland carcinoma
- Ceruminoma
- Cutaneous myoepithelioma
- Cylindroma
- Eccrine carcinoma
- Hidradenoma papilliferum
- Hidrocystoma
- Microcystic adnexal carcinoma
- Mucinous carcinoma
- Papillary eccrine adenoma
- Poroma
- Porocarcinoma
- Syringadenoma papilliferum
- Syringofibroadenoma
- Syringoma

Adenolipomas are lipomas associated with eccrine sweat glands.

=== As signs in other illnesses ===
Many diseases cause sweat gland dysfunction:

- Acromegaly, a result of excess growth hormone, causes the size of sweat glands to increase, which leads to thicker skin.
- Aquagenic wrinkling of the palms, in which white papules develop on the palms after exposure to water, can sometimes come with abnormal aquaporin 5 in the sweat glands.
- Cystic fibrosis can be diagnosed by a sweat test, as the disease causes the sweat glands ducts to reabsorb less chloride, leading to higher concentrations of chloride in the secreted sweat.
- Ectodermal dysplasia can present a lack of sweat glands.
- Fabry disease, characterized by excess globotriaosylceramide (GL3), causes a decrease in sweat gland function due to GL3 deposits in the eccrine glands.
- GM_{1} gangliosidoses, characterized by abnormal lipid storage, leads to vacuolization in eccrine sweat gland cells.
- Hunter syndrome can include metachromin granules and mucin in the cytoplasm of the eccrine sweat gland cells.
- Hypothyroidism's low levels of thyroid hormone lead to decreased secretions from sweat glands; the result is dry, coarse skin.
- Kearns–Sayre syndrome, a disease of the mitochondria, involves abnormal mitochondria in eccrine sweat glands.
- Lafora disease is a rare genetic disorder marked by the presence of abnormal polyglucosan deposits. These "Lafora bodies" appear in the ducts of sweat glands, as well as the myoepithelial cells of apocrine glands.
- Lichen striatus, a self-limited eruption of small, slightly scaly papules, includes a lymphoid infiltrate around eccrine sweat glands.
- Metachromatic leukodystrophy, a lysosomal storage disease, leads to the accumulation of lipopigments and lysosomal residual bodies in the epithelial cells of sweat glands.
- Neuronal ceroid lipofuscinosis causes abnormal deposits of lipopigment in sweat gland epithelial cells (among other places).
- Neutral lipid storage disease includes abnormal lipid deposits in cells, including those of the sweat gland.
- Niemann-Pick disease type C, another lipid storage disease, includes abnormal lipid storage in sweat glands.
- Schindler disease causes cytoplasmic vacuoles that appear to be empty or contain filamentous material to manifest in eccrine sweat gland cells.
- Small fiber peripheral neuropathy can damage the nerves that control the sweat glands. The sweat gland nerve fiber density test can diagnose this condition.

== See also ==
- Sudomotor

== Gallery ==
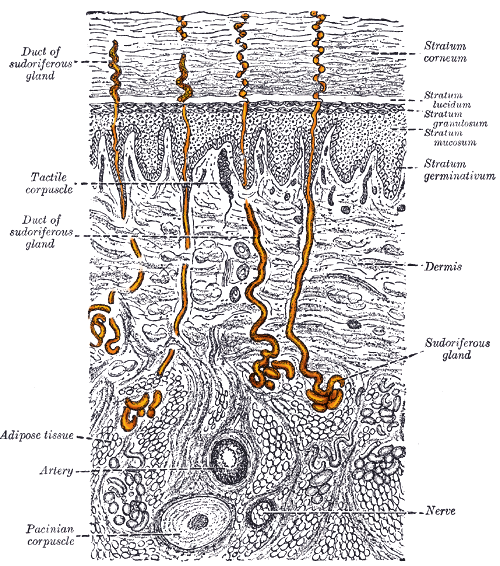
Transverse view of the skin with sweat glands highlighted

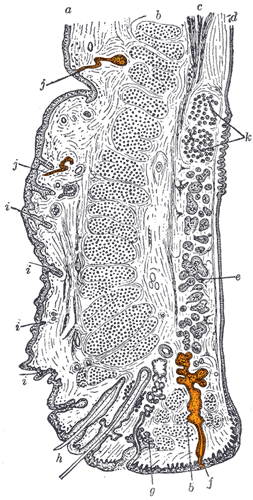
Transverse view of the eyelid with sweat glands highlighted
