= Ceruminous adenocarcinoma =

- Other names: Cylindroma, ceruminoma, ceruminous adenocarcinoma, not otherwise specified (NOS), ceruminous adenoid cystic carcinoma (ACC), ceruminous mucoepidermoid carcinoma
- A high power photomicrograph of a ceruminous type adenoid cystic carcinoma
- Specialty: ENT surgery

Ceruminous adenocarcinoma is a malignant neoplasm derived from ceruminous glands of the external auditory canal. This tumor is rare, with several names used in the past. Synonyms have included cylindroma, ceruminoma, ceruminous adenocarcinoma, not otherwise specified (NOS), ceruminous adenoid cystic carcinoma (ACC), and ceruminous mucoepidermoid carcinoma.

== Classification ==
This tumor only affects the outer 1/3 to 1/2 of the external auditory canal as a primary site. If this area is not involved, the diagnosis should be questioned. The most common tumor type is ceruminous adenoid cystic carcinoma and ceruminous adenocarcinoma, NOS.

== Signs and symptoms ==
Pain is the most common symptom, followed by either sensorineural or conductive hearing loss, tinnitus or drainage (discharge). A mass lesion may be present, but it is often slow growing.

== Diagnosis ==
=== Imaging ===
Imaging studies are used to define the extent of the tumor and to exclude direct extension from the parotid gland or nasopharynx. The imaging findings are usually non-specific, and cannot give a specific diagnosis.

=== Pathology ===
Tumors are polypoid, identified most often in the posterior canal. It is not uncommon to have ulceration of the surface squamous epithelium. Most tumors are about 1.5 cm in greatest dimension, a limitation of the anatomic site rather than of the tumor type itself. The tumors are separated into three main histologic or microscopic types:

- Ceruminous adenocarcinoma, NOS
- Ceruminous adenoid cystic carcinoma
- Ceruminous mucoepidermoid carcinoma

All of the tumors are infiltrative into the soft tissue, benign ceruminous glands, and/or bone. The tumor may expand into the overlying squamous surface epithelium, but it usually does not arise from the surface epithelium. The tumors are cellular, arranged in solid, cystic, cribriform, glandular, and single cell patterns. It is uncommon to see tumor necrosis, but when it is present, it is diagnostic of cancer. The same is true of perineural invasion. Nuclear pleomorphism is usually easily to identify, with the nuclei containing prominent nucleoli. There are usually increased mitotic figures, including atypical forms. There are usually areas of stromal fibrosis. Ceroid (cerumen or ear wax) is not seen in malignancies, although it is seen in benign tumors. The specific features of each tumor type can help with the separation into adenoid cystic carcinoma or mucoepidermoid types.

==== Immunohistochemistry ====
Immunohistochemistry will help to show the biphasic appearance of the tumor, highlighting the basal or the luminal cells:

- Luminal cells: positive with CK7 and CD117
- Basal cells: positive with p63, S100 protein and CK5/6

=== Differential diagnoses ===
It is important to exclude a tumor which is directly extending into the ear canal from the parotid salivary gland, especially when dealing with an adenoid cystic or mucoepidermoid carcinoma. This can be eliminated by clinical or imaging studies. Otherwise, the histologic differential diagnosis includes a ceruminous adenoma (a benign ceruminous gland tumor) or a neuroendocrine adenoma of the middle ear (middle ear adenoma).

== Management ==
Wide, radical, complete surgical excision is the treatment of choice, with free surgical margins to achieve the best outcome and lowest chance of recurrence. Radiation is only used for palliation. In general, there is a good prognosis, although approximately 50% of patients die from disease within 3–10 years of presentation.

== Epidemiology ==
This is a very rare neoplasm accounting for approximately 0.0003% of all tumors and about 2.5% of all external ear neoplasms. Ceruminous adenocarcinomas (CA) is a rare type of tumor and has a very small amount of literature on it. The ages to develop ceruminous adenocarcinomas are between 21 and 92 and being most present around 48. There is no statistical difference between being male and female and developing the tumor and there is no racial inclination. The typical treatment of CA is through surgery and radiation. The type of cut is important with the recurrence rate. Long-term outcomes are better when having the wide cut near the tumor. If the tumor reoccurs there is an 83% chance of mortality and if it does not reoccur there is a 9% chance of mortality. Older people have a lower survival rate than younger ones. The local reoccurrence rate is 49% and the distant metastasis rate is 13%. With local reoccurrence being at 49%, follow-up is very important.
