= Fetal adenocarcinoma =

Rare subtype of pulmonary adenocarcinoma

- Other names: Well differentiated fetal adenocarcinoma, high-grade fetal adenocarcinoma, pulmonary adenocarcinoma of fetal type, and pulmonary endodermal tumour resembling fetal lung.
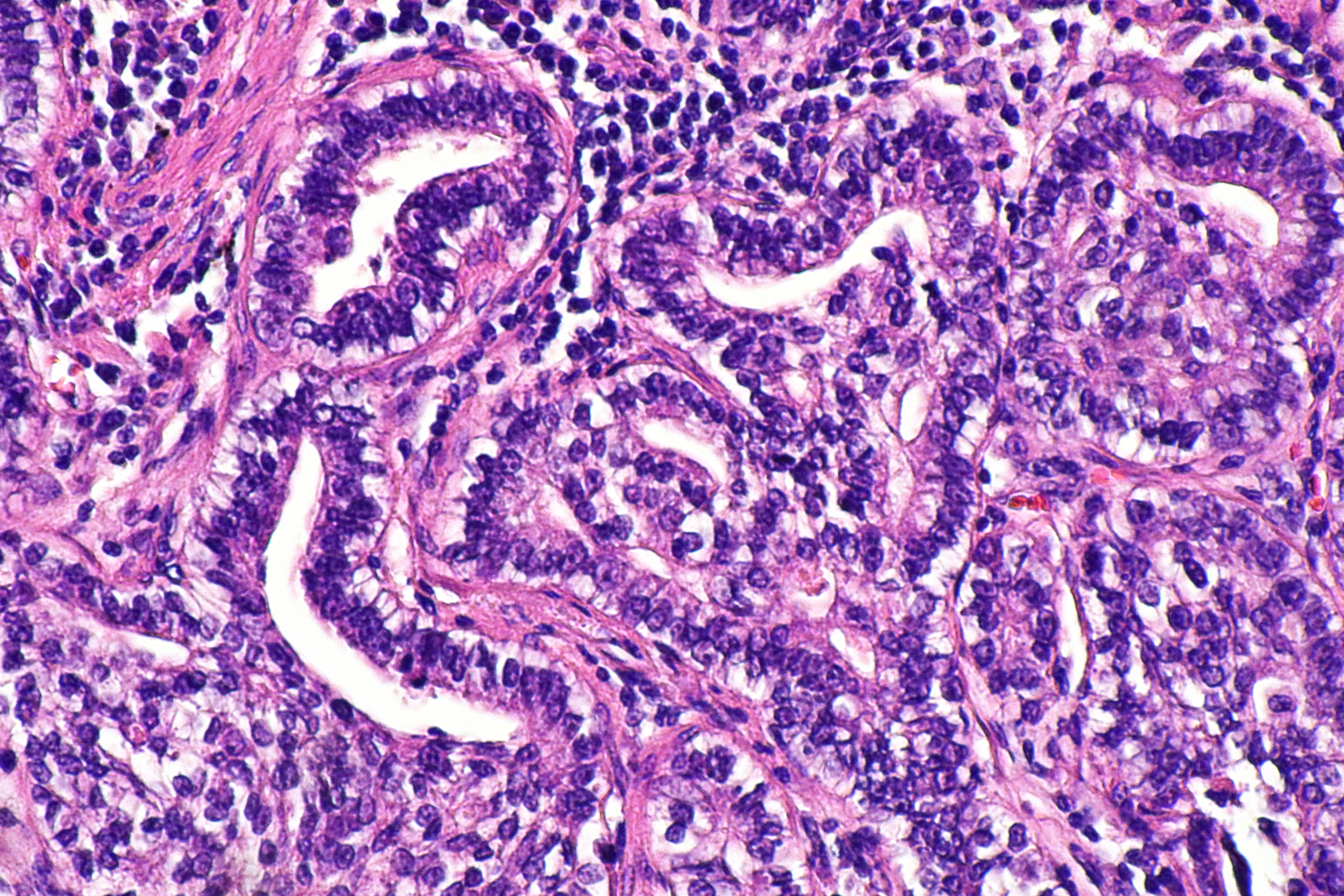
- Micrograph showing fetal adenocarcinoma. H&E stain.

Fetal adenocarcinoma (FA) of the lung is a rare subtype of pulmonary adenocarcinoma that exhibits tissue architecture and cell characteristics that resemble fetal lung tissue upon microscopic examination. It is currently considered a variant of solid adenocarcinoma with mucin production.

== Symptoms and signs ==
FA can produce repeated hemoptysis, possibly related to cavitation of the tumor.

Other presenting symptoms described have included: flu-like syndrome with cough and fever,

== Genetics ==
Due to its rarity, little is known of the genetics of FA.

One small series of 6 cases showed that MDM2 protein was expressed in 5 of them (83%), and p53 protein was overexpressed in 50%. However, a larger series of 12 cases revealed no p53 gene mutations.

== Histogenesis ==
The details of the histogenesis of FA remain unknown and highly debated. Adenocarcinomas are most often highly heterogeneous peripheral tumors, and are thought to arise from malignant transformation of primitive cells that can exhibit differentiation characteristics of Club cells, Type II pneumocytes, bronchiolar surface cells, bronchial gland cells, or goblet cells.

Most FA's are well or moderately differentiated tumors, although high-grade, poorly differentiated variants have been described. Tissue resembling FA can also be found admixed with a component made up of primitive blastoma-like cells. In such cases, these biphasic tumors are classified as a form of pulmonary blastoma because the presence of the blastomatous cells dramatically worsens the prognosis.

FA can occur in combination with other forms of lung cancer, particularly other variants of adenocarcinoma. There also seems to be an association with clear cell lung cancer variants. A case of combined small cell lung carcinoma featuring components of FA and cells resembling those from carcinoid tumor has been reported, illustrating the unique complexity and heterogeneity of divergent histogenesis and cell differentiation in lung cancer.

== Diagnosis ==
FA is an epithelial tumor whose cells and architecture resemble that of fetal lung tissues in the pseudoglandular stage of development (which occurs at about 10–16 weeks gestation in the human), with complex glandular structures and morules with cell nuclei that appear clear due to the accumulation of biotin.

While FA can be diagnosed via biopsy, bronchial brushings, and immunocytochemistry, examination of the whole tumor is required to rule out biphasic pulmonary blastoma, a mixed tumor of higher aggressiveness, wherein FA occurs admixed with primitive blastoma cells.

Although it is not normally considered a fast-growing malignant neoplasm, FA can exhibit high uptake on FDG-PET scanning.

Identification of aberrant nuclear localization of a mutated protein product of the beta-catenin gene has been proposed as a diagnostic tool for FA.

Although FA's usually occur as nodules or masses, they can sometimes present as a multifocal disease.

== Treatment ==
Because of its extreme rarity, there have been no controlled clinical trials of treatment regimens for FA and, as a result, there are no evidence-based treatment guidelines. Complete surgical resection is the treatment of choice in FA, as it is in nearly all forms of lung cancer.

Anecdotal reports suggest that FA is rarely highly sensitive to cytotoxic drugs or radiation. Case reports suggest that chemotherapy with UFT may be useful in FA.

== Prognosis ==
The prognosis of patients with FA as a whole is considered to be better than that of most other forms of non-small cell carcinoma, including biphasic pulmonary blastoma.

== Incidence ==
FA is a rare tumor, with a relative incidence estimated to be no more than 0.5% of all lung cancers.

FA is exceptionally rare in children, with only a handful of cases reported to date, However, several case reports have involved FA's in pregnant women or the early postnatal period.
