= Apocrine gland carcinoma =

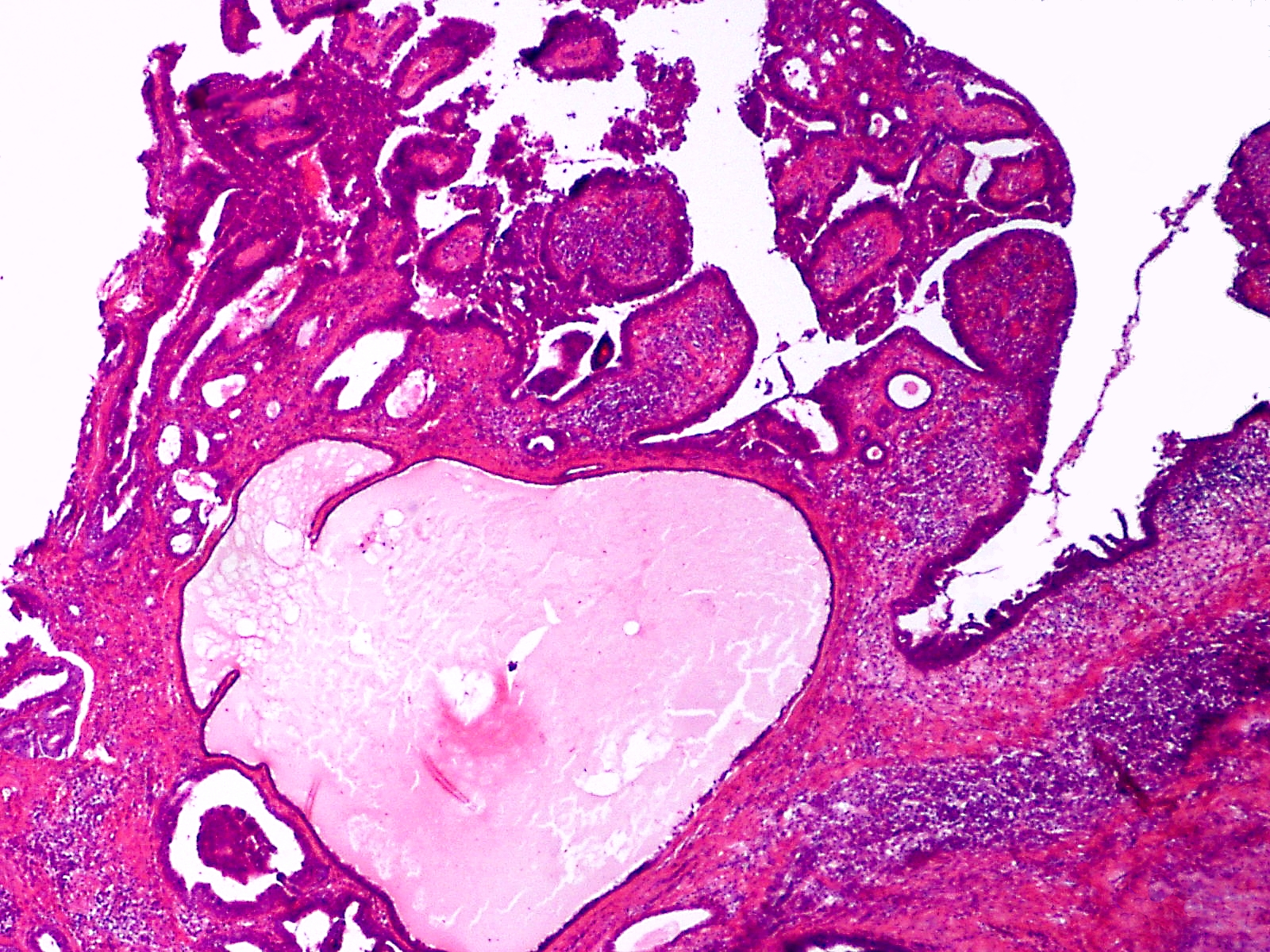
- Apocrine gland carcinoma, papillary type
- Specialty: Dermatology/oncology

Apocrine gland carcinoma is a cutaneous condition characterized by skin lesions which form in the axilla or anogenital regions.

== See also ==
- Eccrine carcinoma
- Primary cutaneous adenoid cystic carcinoma
- Skin lesion
