= Aggressive digital papillary adenocarcinoma =

- Other names: Digital papillary adenocarcinoma and papillary adenoma
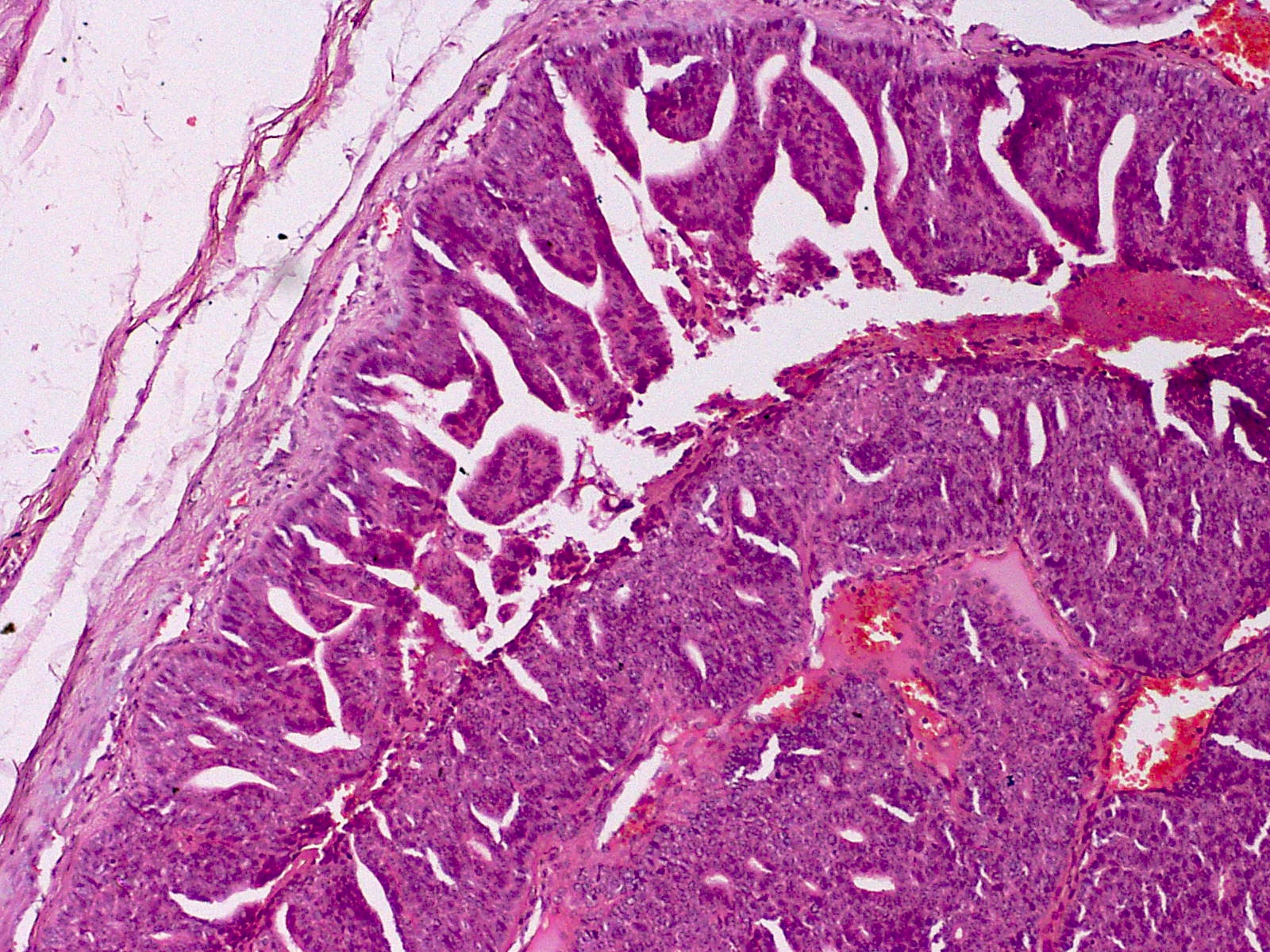
- Digital papillary adenocarcinoma or aggressive digital papillary adenoma
- Specialty: Dermatology/Oncology

Aggressive digital papillary adenocarcinoma, also known as digital papillary adenocarcinoma and papillary adenoma, is a cutaneous condition characterized by an aggressive malignancy involving the digit between the nailbed and the distal interphalangeal joint spaces. Genetic studies reveal that human papilloma virus HPV42 is the likely driving virus in this cancer.

== Signs and symptoms ==
Aggressive digital papillary adenocarcinoma typically appears as a painless solitary mass on the plantar surface of the feet or palmer surface of the hands.

== Diagnosis ==
Histologically, the tumor exhibits a mixed tubuloalveolar and papillary pattern, focal squamous metaplasia, fibrocollagenous stroma, and a grenz zone. In situ hybridization for HPV42 DNA may help in differentiating this cancer from related tumors.

The sweat gland adenoid cystic carcinoma, mucinous eccrine carcinoma, and apocrine adenocarcinoma are included in the differential diagnosis.

== Treatment ==
As a first-line surgical strategy, wide local excision with clear resection of margins is advised rather than proximal amputation, and there is currently insufficient evidence to justify the routine use of adjuvant chemotherapy or radiotherapy.

== Epidemiology ==
Aggressive digital papillary adenocarcinoma primarily affects men and is usually diagnosed between the ages of 50 and 70.

== See also ==
- Mucinous carcinoma
- List of cutaneous conditions
