= Primary cutaneous adenoid cystic carcinoma =

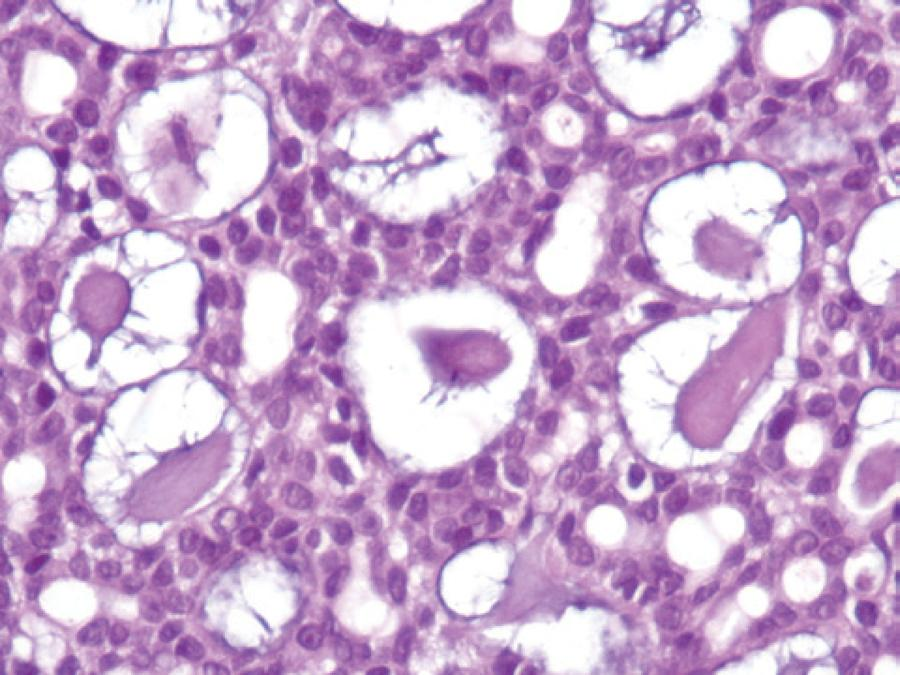
- Primary cutaneous adenoid cystic carcinoma (PCACC) of the right lower eyelid. The micrograph shows cells covering cystic spaces showing arrangement in two cell layers.
- Specialty: Dermatology

Primary cutaneous adenoid cystic carcinoma is a cutaneous condition characterized by a tumor that usually presents on the chest, scalp, or vulva of middle- to older-aged persons. It is a hard, slow growing, ill-defined tumor causing discomfort, itching, and secondary baldness, or may be asymptomatic. The condition is rare and believed to be caused by somatic mutations. It was characterized in 1975.

Diagnosis relies on tumor histology features, but a comprehensive clinical and radiographic examination is necessary to identify other primary disease indications, especially in salivary glands. The condition is treated with broad surgical excision with a 2 cm safety margin, and lymphadenectomy if nodal involvement is suspected.

== Signs and symptoms ==
Primary cutaneous adenoid cystic carcinoma frequently manifests as a hard, slowly expanding, ill-defined nodule or tumor that can cause symptoms including discomfort, itching, and secondary baldness, or it might be asymptomatic. The locations of predilection have been the chest and scalp (at least 40%).

== Causes ==
It's uncertain what causes primary cutaneous adenoid cystic carcinoma. They most likely stem from somatic mutations. Somatic mutation patterns haven't been studied, though. Histopathology indicates that a common developmental mechanism is shared by salivary and primary cutaneous adenoid cystic carcinoma, since many of them exhibited high levels of MYB by immunohistochemistry or carried the fusion gene MYB-NFIB.

== Diagnosis ==
Due to the lack of distinct clinical signs in primary cutaneous adenoid cystic carcinoma, the diagnosis is generally made based on the features of the tumor's histology. A thorough clinical and radiographic examination must be performed in order to search for other indications of primary disease, particularly in the salivary glands.

== Treatment ==
In order to prevent the tumor's frequent recurrence, the usual therapy for primary cutaneous adenoid cystic carcinoma involves a broad surgical excision with at least a 2 cm safety margin from the tumor. When there is a surgical or clinical suspicion of nodal involvement, lymphadenectomy is carried out.

== See also ==
- Aggressive digital papillary adenocarcinoma
- Mucinous carcinoma
