= Organ system =

Group of organs assembled in a structural unit to serve a common function

Identifiers
- FMA: 7149

An organ system is a biological system consisting of a group of organs that work together to perform one or more bodily functions. Each organ has a specialized role in an organism body, and is made up of distinct tissues.

== Humans ==
Nervous system in a human body

There are 11 distinct organ systems in human beings, which form the basis of human anatomy and physiology. These are the respiratory, digestive and excretory, circulatory, urinary, integumentary, skeletal, muscular, endocrine, lymphatic, nervous, and reproductive systems. There are other systems in the body that are not organ systems—for example, the immune system protects the organism from infection, but it is not an organ system since it is not composed of organs. Some organs are in more than one system—for example, the nose is in the respiratory system and also serves as a sensory organ in the nervous system; the testes and ovaries are both part of the reproductive and endocrine systems.

Organ system	Description	Component organs
Respiratory system	breathing: exchange of oxygen and carbon dioxide	nose, mouth, paranasal sinuses, pharynx, larynx, trachea, bronchi, lungs and thoracic diaphragm
Digestive and excretory system	digestion: breakdown and absorption of nutrients, excretion of solid wastes	teeth, tongue, salivary glands, esophagus, stomach, liver, gallbladder, pancreas, small intestine, large intestine, rectum and anus
Circulatory system	circulate blood in order to transport nutrients, waste, hormones, O_{2}, CO_{2}, and aid in maintaining pH and temperature	blood, heart, arteries, veins and capillaries
Urinary system	maintain fluid and electrolyte balance, purify blood and excrete liquid waste (urine)	kidneys, ureters, bladder and urethra
Integumentary system	exterior protection of body and thermal regulation	skin, hair, fat and nails
Skeletal system	structural support and protection, production of blood cells	bones, cartilage, ligaments and tendons
Muscular system	movement of body, production of heat	skeletal muscles, smooth muscles and cardiac muscle
Endocrine system	communication within the body using hormones made by endocrine glands	hypothalamus, pituitary, pineal gland, thyroid, parathyroid and adrenal glands, ovaries and testicles
Exocrine system	various functions including lubrication and protection	ceruminous glands, lacrimal glands, sebaceous glands and mucus
Lymphatic system	return lymph to the bloodstream, aid immune responses, form white blood cells	lymph, lymph nodes, lymph vessels, tonsils, spleen and thymus
Nervous system	sensing and processing information, controlling body activities	brain, spinal cord, nerves, sensory organs and the following sensory systems (nervous subsystems): visual system, smell (olfactory system), taste (gustatory system) and hearing (auditory system)
Reproductive system	sex organs involved in reproduction	ovaries, fallopian tubes, uterus, vagina, vulva, penis, testicles, vasa deferentia, seminal vesicles and prostate

== Other animals ==
Other animals have similar organ systems to humans, although simpler animals may have a lot of organs in an organ system or have fewer organ systems.

== Plants ==
Root and shoot systems in a eudicot

Plants have two major organs systems. Vascular plants have two distinct organ systems: a shoot system, and a root system. The shoot system consists stems, leaves, and the reproductive parts of the plant (flowers and fruits). The shoot system generally grows above ground, where it absorbs the light needed for photosynthesis. The root system, which supports the plants and absorbs water and minerals, is usually underground.

Organ system	Description	Component organs
Root system	anchors plants into place, absorbs water and minerals, stores carbohydrates, and sends it to organs such as the xyleme and the phloeme, which transport nutrients such as sugar, oxygen and sugars/foods	roots
Shoot system	stem for holding and orienting leaves to the sun as well as transporting materials between roots and leaves, leaves for photosynthesis, and flowers for reproduction	stem, leaves, and flowers
