= Biphasic disease =

Disease with two distinct phases

A biphasic disease is a disease which has two distinct phases or components. In clinically biphasic diseases, the phases are generally chronologically separated. In histopathologically biphasic tumors (also called biplastic tumors), there is neoplastic tissue which contains two different cellular elements.

== Examples of a biphasic desease ==
=== Clinically biphasic diseases ===
Disease	Typical first phase	Typical second phase
European (or "Western") subtype of tick-borne encephalitis virus	Relatively mild flu-like illness	Affecting some cases, generally presenting with high fever and neurologic disease (encephalitis), meningitis and/or meningoencephalitis)
Leptospirosis	4–9 days of abrupt onset of flu-like illness	Fever, jaundice, abdominal pain and diarrhoea. Organ failure in severe cases.
Anthrax	After approximately 4 days, patients develop flu-like illness with fever, nonproductive cough, and myalgias lasting approximately 4 days	Without timely treatment, a second fulminant phase follows, characterized by hypotension and dyspnea. This phase may progress to death within 24 hours of its onset.

=== Tumor biplasia ===
Disease	Cellular elements	
Fibroadenoma	Epithelium	Stroma
Ceruminous adenoma	Inner luminal secretory cells	Myoepithelial cells
