= Adenocarcinoma =

Cancer of epithelial cells with glandular origin or characteristics

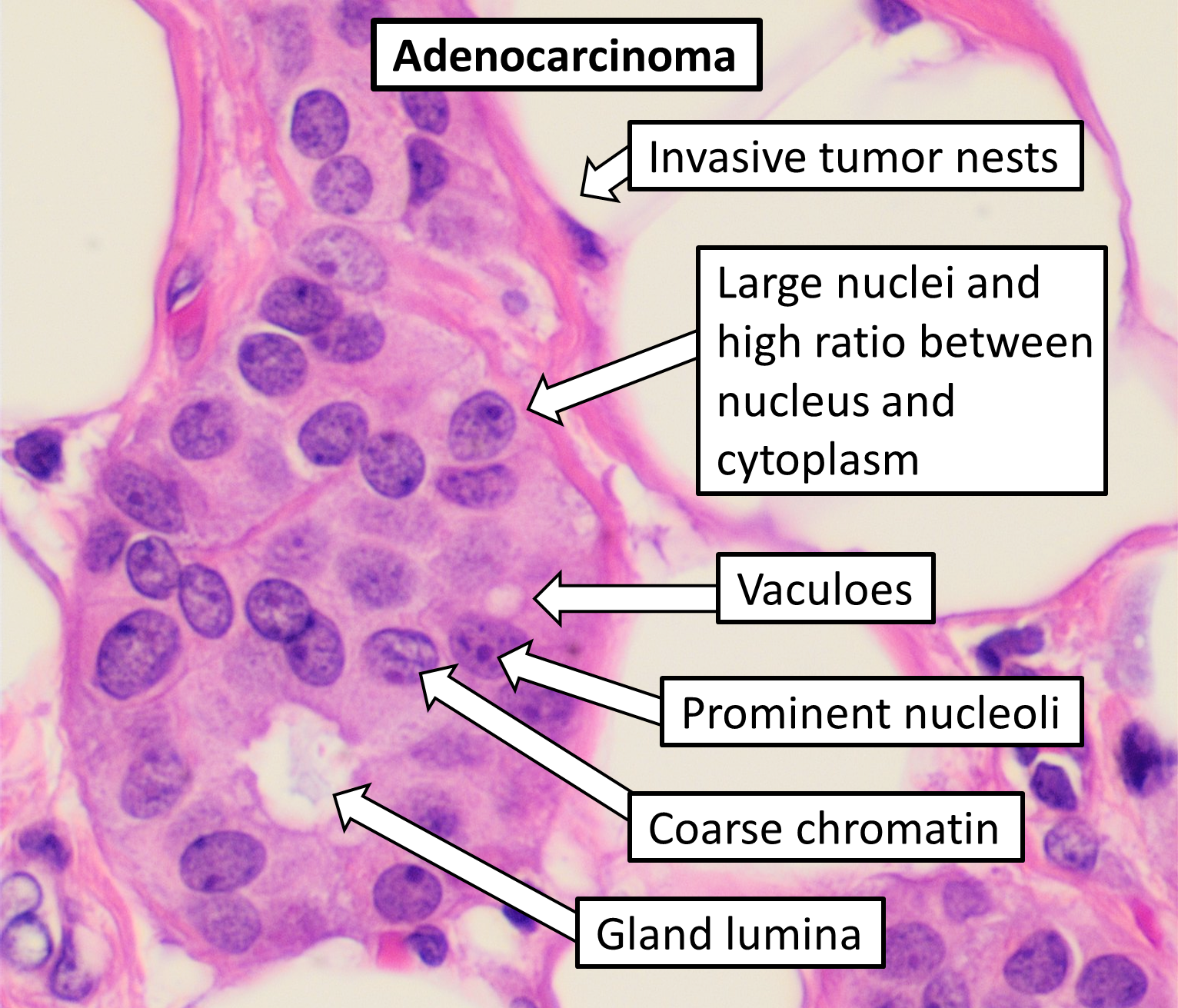
- Histopathology of typical features of adenocarcinoma on H&E stain, but in reality the visual features vary substantially, both by subtypes of adenocarcinoma as well as between individual cases.
- Specialty: Oncology, Pathology

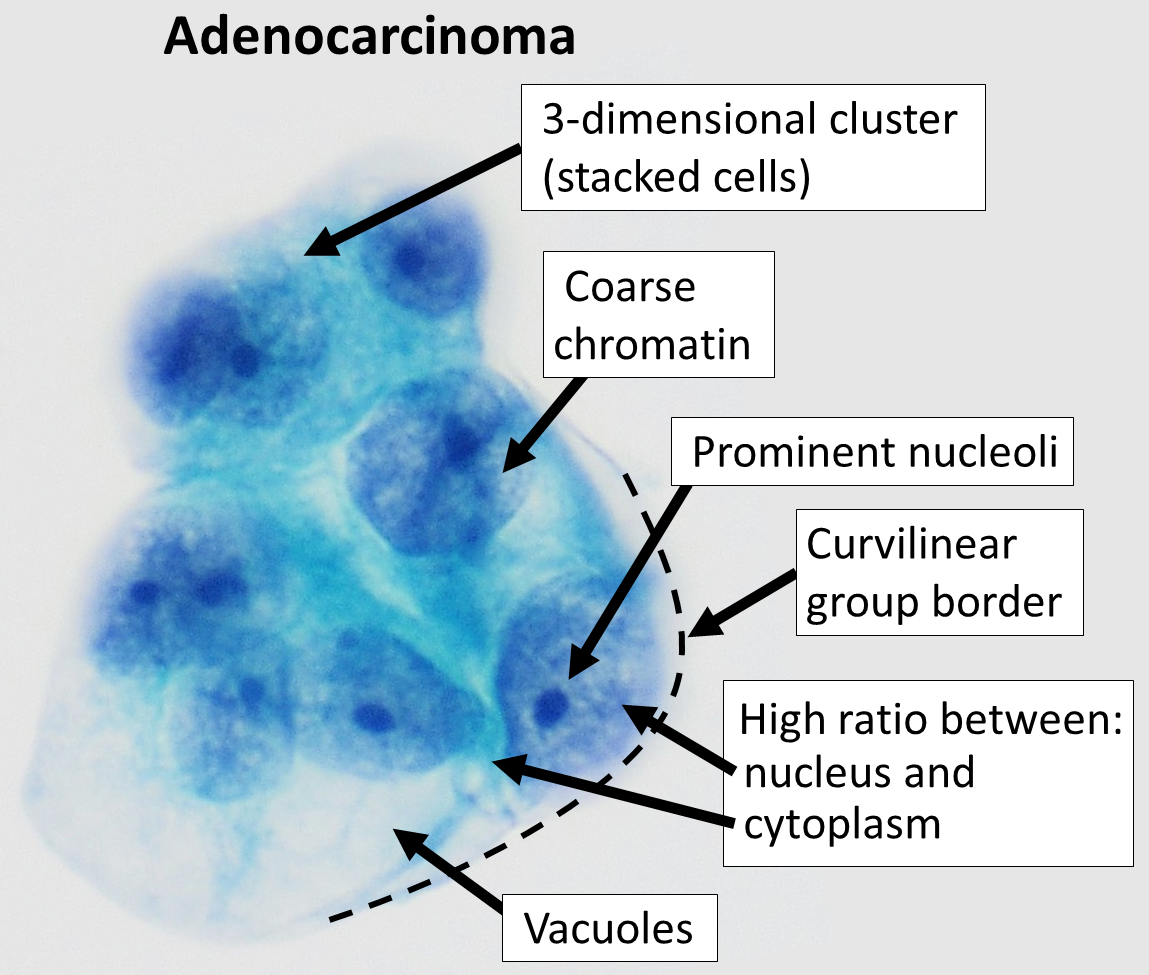
Micrograph showing typical features of adenocarcinoma on cytopathology (Pap stain). Vacuoles are more prominent in mucinous tumors but can be seen in serous tumors as well.

Adenocarcinoma (Note: /ˌædɪnoʊkɑːrsɪˈnoʊmə/, plural adenocarcinomas or adenocarcinomata /ˌædɪnoʊkɑːrsɪˈnoʊmətə/. From adeno-, "gland", karkin(o)-, "cancerous" and -oma, "tumor".) (AC) is a type of cancer made of cells from glands. They can occur in many parts of the body. Adenocarcinomas are part of the larger grouping of carcinomas, but are also sometimes called by more precise terms, omitting the word when these exist. Adenocarcinomas are defined as neoplasia of epithelial tissue that has a glandular origin or glandular characteristics. Thus, invasive ductal carcinoma, the most common form of breast cancer, is adenocarcinoma, although the term is not used in its name. However, aesophageal adenocarcinoma can be distinguished from the other common type of aesophageal cancer, aesophageal squamous cell carcinoma. Several of the most common forms of cancer are adenocarcinomas, and the various sorts of adenocarcinoma vary greatly in all their aspects, so that few useful generalizations can be made about them.

In the most specific usage, the glandular origin or traits are exocrine; endocrine gland tumors, such as a VIPoma, an insulinoma, or a pheochromocytoma, are typically not referred to as adenocarcinomas but rather are often called neuroendocrine tumors. Epithelial tissue sometimes includes, but is not limited to, the surface layer of skin, glands, and a variety of other tissues that line the cavities and organs of the body. Epithelial tissue can be derived embryologically from any of the germ layers (ectoderm, endoderm, or mesoderm). To be classified as adenocarcinoma, the cells do not necessarily need to be part of a gland, as long as they have secretory properties. Adenocarcinoma is the malignant counterpart to adenoma, which is the benign form of such tumors. Sometimes adenomas transform into adenocarcinomas, but most do not.

Well-differentiated adenocarcinomas tend to resemble the glandular tissue that they are derived from, while poorly differentiated adenocarcinomas may not. By staining the cells from a biopsy, a pathologist can determine whether the tumor is an adenocarcinoma or some other type of cancer. Adenocarcinomas can arise in many tissues of the body owing to the ubiquitous occurrence of glands within the body, and, more fundamentally, to the potency of epithelial cells. While each gland may not secrete the same substance, as long as there is an exocrine function of the cell, it is considered glandular, and its malignant form is therefore called adenocarcinoma.

== Histopathology ==
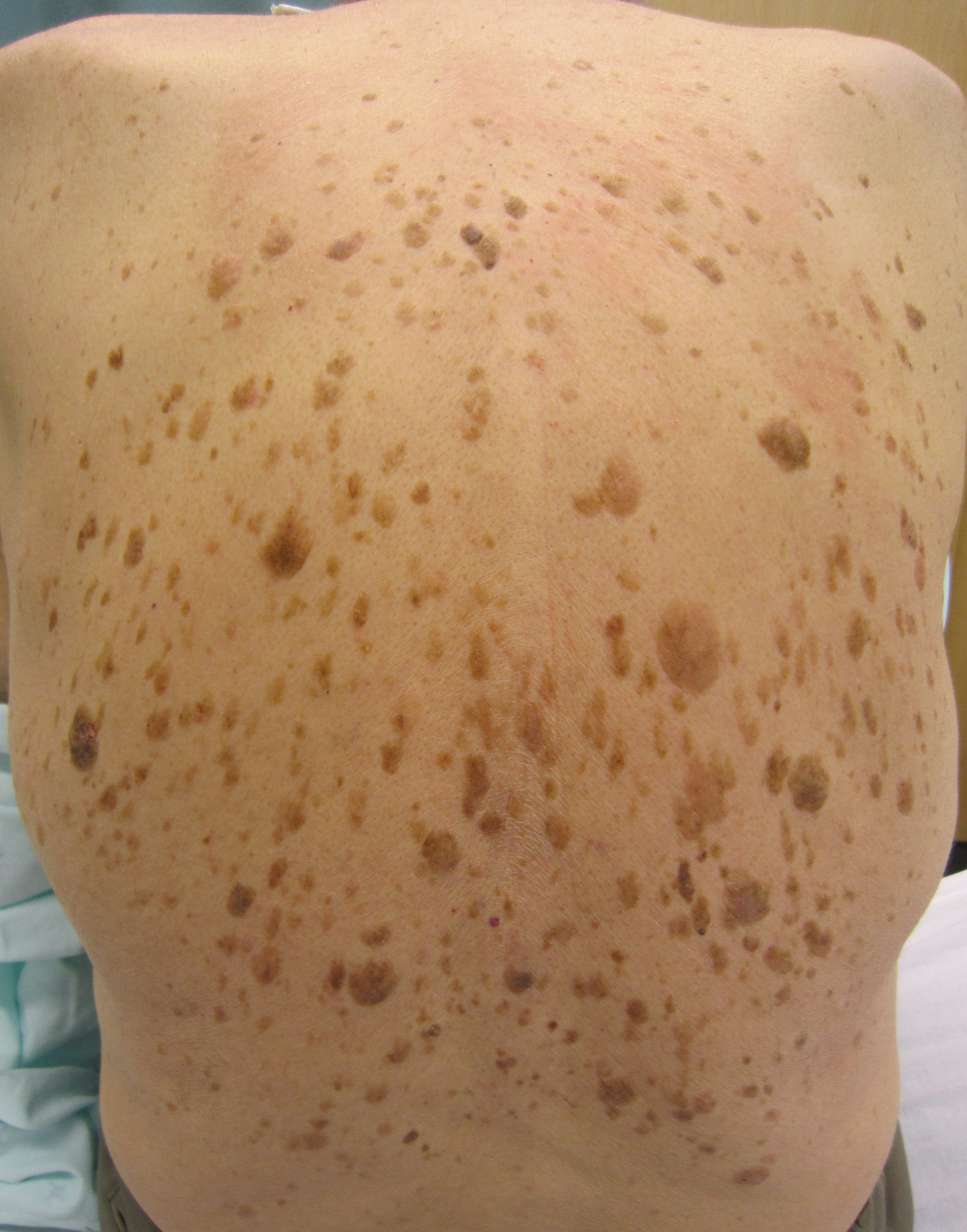
Many seborrheic keratoses on back of person with Leser–Trélat sign due to colon cancer

Examples of cancers where adenocarcinomas are a common form:

- esophageal cancer; most cases in the developed world are adenocarcinomas.
- pancreas; over 80% of pancreatic cancers are ductal adenocarcinomas.
- prostate cancer is nearly always adenocarcinoma
- cervical cancer: most is squamous cell cancer, but 10–15% of cervical cancers are adenocarcinomas
- stomach cancer: is almost always an adenocarcinoma but in rare cases are extranodal marginal zone B-cell lymphomas (also termed MALT lymphomas).

=== Breast ===
Most breast cancers start in the ducts or lobules, and are adenocarcinomas. The three most common histopathological types collectively represent approximately three-quarters of breast cancers:

- Invasive ductal carcinoma: 55% of breast cancers
- Ductal carcinoma in situ: 13%
- Invasive lobular carcinoma: 5%

=== Colon ===
The vast majority of colorectal cancers are adenocarcinomas. This is because the colon has numerous glands. Normal colonic glands tend to be simple and tubular in appearance with a mixture of mucus-secreting goblet cells and water-absorbing cells. These glands secrete mucus into the lumen of the colon to lubricate the feces as they pass towards the rectum.

When these glands undergo a number of changes at the genetic level, they proceed in a predictable manner as they move from benign to an invasive, malignant colon cancer. In their research paper "Lessons from Hereditary Colorectal Cancer", Vogelstein, et al., suggested that colon cells lose the APC tumor suppressor gene and become a small polyp. Next, they suggested that k-Ras becomes activated and the polyp becomes a small, benign adenoma. The adenoma, lacking the "carcinoma" attached to the end of it, suggests that it is a benign version of the malignant adenocarcinoma. The gastroenterologist uses a colonoscopy to find and remove these adenomas and polyps to prevent them from continuing to acquire genetic changes that will lead to an invasive adenocarcinoma. Vogelstein et al. went on to suggest that loss of the DCC gene and of p53 result in a malignant adenocarcinoma.

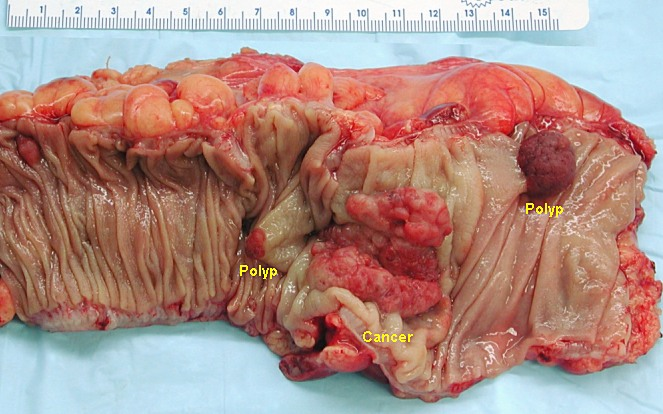
Gross appearance of an opened colectomy specimen containing two adenomatous polyps (the brownish oval tumors above the labels, attached to the normal beige lining by a stalk) and one invasive colorectal carcinoma (the crater-like, reddish, irregularly-shaped tumor located above the label)

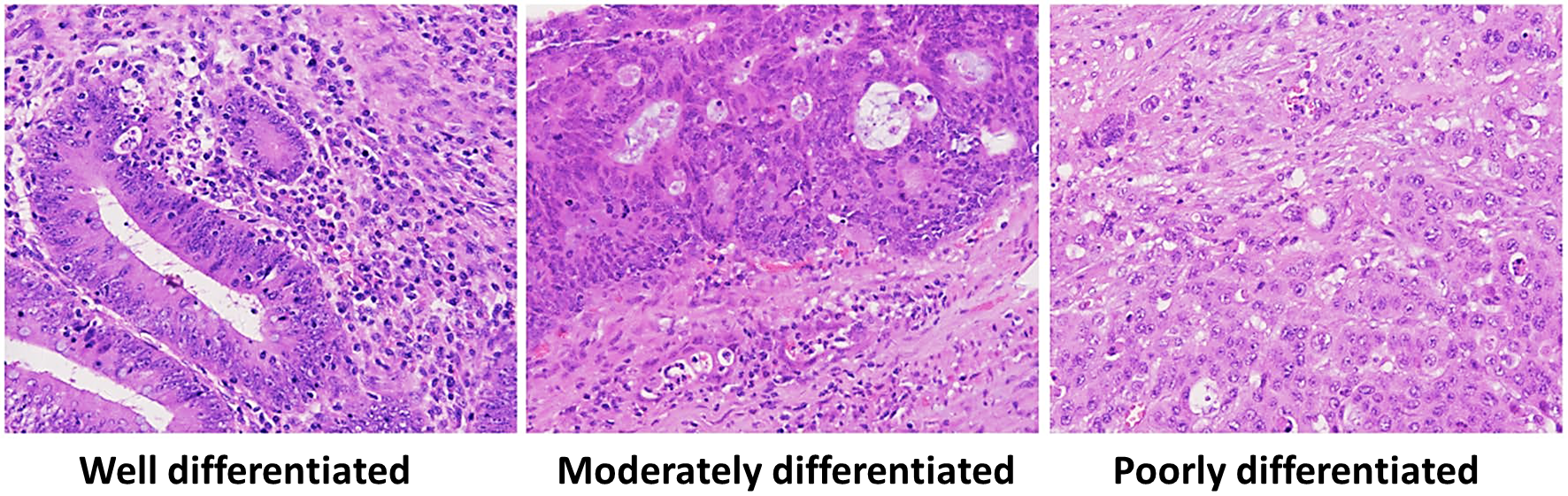
Histopathology of well-, moderately and poorly differentiated colorectal adenocarcinoma.

=== Lung ===
Pie chart showing incidence of adenocarcinoma of the lung (shown in yellow) as compared to other lung cancer types, with fractions of non-smokers versus smokers shown for each type

Nearly 40% of lung cancers are adenocarcinomas, which usually originate in peripheral lung tissue. Most cases of adenocarcinoma are associated with smoking; however, among people who have smoked fewer than 100 cigarettes in their lifetimes ("never-smokers"), adenocarcinoma is the most common form of lung cancer. A subtype of adenocarcinoma, the bronchioloalveolar carcinoma, is more common in female never-smokers, and may have a better long-term survival.

This cancer usually is seen peripherally in the lungs, as opposed to small cell lung cancer and squamous cell lung cancer, which both tend to be more centrally located.

=== Other ===
- Cholangiocarcinoma, or bile duct cancer
- Prostate cancer
- Stomach cancer
- Cancer of the urachus
- Vaginal cancer

== See also ==
- Clear-cell adenocarcinoma – Type of adenocarcinoma that shows clear cells
- Fetal adenocarcinoma – Rare subtype of pulmonary adenocarcinoma
