= Neuroendocrine adenoma middle ear =

Tumor in middle ear

Neuroendocrine adenoma middle ear (NAME) is a tumor which arises from a specific anatomic site, the middle ear. NAME is a benign glandular neoplasm of middle ear showing histologic and immunohistochemical neuroendocrine and mucin-secreting differentiation (biphasic or dual differentiation).

== Classification ==
Neuroendocrine adenoma of the middle ear has gone by several different names, including middle ear adenoma, carcinoid tumor, amphicrine adenoma, adenocarcinoid, and adenomatoid tumor of middle ear. The various names have created some confusion about this uncommon middle ear tumor. Regardless of the name applied, the middle ear anatomic site must be known or confirmed.

== Signs and symptoms ==
This uncommon tumor accounts for less than 2% of all ear tumors. While patients present with symptoms related to the middle ear cavity location of the tumor, the tumor may expand into the adjacent structures (external auditory canal, mastoid bone, and eustachian tube). Patients come to clinical attention with unilateral (one sided) hearing loss, usually associated with decreased auditory acuity, and particularly conductive hearing loss if the ossicular bone chain (middle ear bones) is involved. Tinnitus (ringing), otitis media, pressure or occasionally ear discharge are seen. At the time of otoscopic exam, the tympanic membrane is usually intact, with a fluid level or mass noted behind the ear drum. Even though this is a "neuroendocrine" type tumor, there is almost never evidence of neuroendocrine function clinically or by laboratory examination.

== Imaging findings ==
In general, an axial and coronal bone computed tomography study without contrast will yield the most information for this tumor. The tumor appears as a soft tissue mass usually within a well-aerated mastoid bone. The features of chronic otitis media are not usually seen. Bone invasion and destruction are usually not seen in this tumor which expands within the mesotympanum (middle ear cavity). Encasement of the ossicles is usually present. There may be an irregular margin at the periphery, especially if the tumor has been present for a long time, with associated bone remodeling.

== Pathology findings ==
A hematoxylin and eosin stained intermediate power showing an infiltrating tumor with glandular and neuroendocrine features in a neuroendocrine adenoma of the middle ear.

At the time of surgery, the tumor tends to peel away from the adjacent bones, although not the ossicles. It is usually fragmented, soft, rubbery and white to gray-tan. Due to the anatomic confines of the region, tumors are usually <1 cm. The tumors arise below the surface, are unencapsulated, and have an infiltrative pattern of growth, composed of many different patterns (glandular, trabecular, cords, festoons, single cells). The tumor shows duct-like structures with inner luminal, flattened cells and outer, basal, cuboidal cells. The cells may have an eccentrically placed nucleus. The nuclear chromatin distribution is "salt-and-pepper", giving a delicate, fine appearance. Nucleoli are small with inconspicuous mitoses. There may be secretions in the gland tumor. It is possible to see a concurrent cholesteatoma.

=== Histochemistry ===
It is possible to see intracytoplasmic as well as luminal mucinous material highlighted by a Periodic acid-Schiff (PAS) or Alcian blue stain.

=== Immunohistochemistry ===
The tumor cells differential stain with markers for epithelial and neuroendocrine immunohistochemistry markers.

- Both cell types positive: pancytokeratin, CK7, CAM5.2
- Inner luminal cells positive: CK7
- Outer basal cells positive: chromogranin, synaptophysin, CD56, and human pancreatic polypeptide (HPP).

=== Electron microscopy ===
Scanning electron microscopy shows two distinct cell types:

- Type A: Apical dark cells with elongated microvilli and secretory mucus granules;
- Type B: Basal cells with cytoplasmic, solid, dense-core neurosecretory granules.

In a few areas, transitional forms with features of both cell types may be present.

== Diagnosis ==
From a pathology perspective, several tumors need to be considered in the differential diagnosis, including paraganglioma, ceruminous adenoma, metastatic adenocarcinoma, and meningioma.

== Management ==
The tumor must be removed with as complete a surgical excision as possible. In nearly all cases, the ossicular chain must be included if recurrences are to be avoided. Due to the anatomic site of involvement, facial nerve paralysis and/or paresthesias may be seen or develop; this is probably due to mass effect rather than nerve invasion. In a few cases, reconstructive surgery may be required. Since this is a benign tumor, no radiation is required. Patients experience an excellent long term outcome, although recurrences can be seen (up to 15%), especially if the ossicular chain is not removed. Although controversial, metastases are not seen in this tumor. There are reports of disease in the neck lymph nodes, but these patients have also had other diseases or multiple surgeries, such that it may represent iatrogenic disease.

== Epidemiology ==
Most individuals come to clinical attention during the 5th decade, although the age range is broad (20 to 80 years). There is an equal gender distribution.
