= Papillary eccrine adenoma =

- Specialty: Dermatology

Papillary eccrine adenoma is a cutaneous condition characterized by an uncommon benign sweat gland neoplasm that presents as a dermal nodule located primarily on the extremities of black patients.

== See also ==
- Syringadenoma papilliferum
- Skin lesion
