= Blastoma =

Type of cancer arising from precursor cells

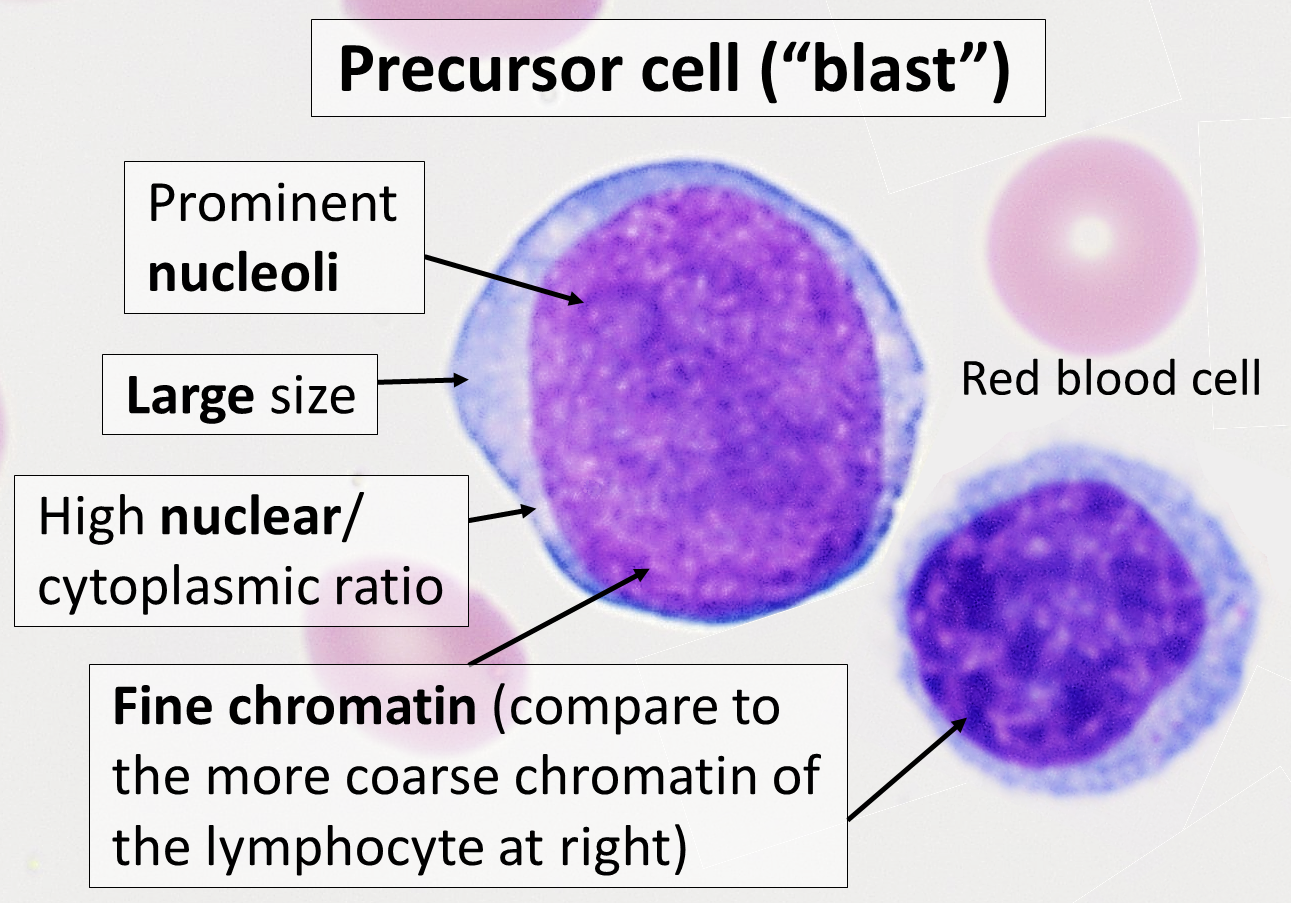
Cytology of a precursor (blast) cell, with features often seen even after partial differentiation into any of the more specific cell types. Wright's stain.

A blastoma is a type of cancer, more common in children, that is caused by malignancies in precursor cells, often called blasts. Examples are nephroblastoma, medulloblastoma, and retinoblastoma. The suffix -blastoma is used to imply a tumor of primitive, incompletely differentiated (or precursor) cells, e.g., chondroblastoma is composed of cells resembling the precursor of chondrocytes.

== Molecular biology and treatment ==
Many types of blastoma have been linked to a mutation in tumor suppressor genes. For example, pleuropulmonary blastomas have been linked to a coding mutation for p53. However, the mutation which allows proliferation of incompletely differentiated cells can vary from patient to patient and can alter the prognosis.

In the case of retinoblastoma, patients carry a visibly abnormal karyotype, with a loss of function mutation on a specific band of chromosome 13. This recessive deletion on the rb gene is also associated with other cancer types and must be present on both alleles, for a normal cell to progress toward malignancy.

Thus, in the case of common blastomas, such as retinoblastomas, a practitioner may go directly into treatment. However, in the case of rarer, more-genetically-linked blastomas, practitioners may karyotype the patient before proceeding with treatment. Some examples of blastomas are hepatoblastoma, medulloblastoma, nephroblastoma, neuroblastoma, pancreatoblastoma, pleuropulmonary blastoma, retinoblastoma, glioblastoma multiforme and gonadoblastoma.

== Types of blastomas ==
=== Hepatoblastoma ===
Hepatoblastoma (HBL) is often diagnosed during the first 3 years of life. In most cases, HBL is a sporadic pathology, although it has been sometimes associated with specific genetic abnormalities such as the Beckwith-Wiedemann syndrome and familial adenomatous polyposis.

The incidence of HBL has increased over the last three decades, with higher risks for development in premature babies with a birth weight of less than 1 kilogram. Increased survival rate for premature babies may also account for the rise in HBL incidence. The most common signs for diagnosis are abdominal distention and discomfort, generalized fatigue, loss of appetite and secondary anemia.

The most important clinical marker for HBL is serum alpha-fetoprotein (AFP), except in the case of some rare variants of HBL and hepatocellular carcinoma that exhibit lower AFP levels.

=== Medulloblastoma ===
Brain tumors are the most common type of solid tumors to affect the pediatric population.

In particular, medulloblastoma is the most common of them, and constitutes about 20% of all the malignant pediatric brain tumors.

Mortality during the first few years after diagnosis is around 15%, although current therapeutic approaches have reached cure rates of up to 90%. The most common forms of therapy are a combination of surgical resection, radiation, and chemotherapy. Survival rates after treatment are between 50% and 90%, a wide range that is influenced by the age at diagnosis, metastasis and histologic variants of the medulloblastoma of each patient. However, despite the long-term survival achieved with current treatments, the neurologic, endocrinologic, and cognitive effects are still a great concern in the treatment of medulloblastoma.

=== Nephroblastoma ===
The most common type of renal cancer in children is nephroblastoma, also known as Wilms tumor.

Nephroblastoma is also the fourth most common pediatric cancer form, and the most common pediatric abdominal cancer, typically diagnosed in children from zero to five years old.

The name of this tumor type comes from the man who first described it in 1899, the German physician Dr. Max Wilms. Although the cause for the development of this tumor is still not fully understood, it is hypothesized that it is caused by genetic mutation that alter the embryological development of the genitourinary tract, and some of the genetic markers that have been associated with this process are WT1, CTNNB1, and WTX, which are found in around one third of reported Wilms tumors.

There are other genetic markers that have been related to this disease, such as TP53 and MYCN, where TP53 correlates to an overall poorer prognosis.

=== Neuroblastoma ===
The most common form of extra-cranial solid tumor in children is neuroblastoma, which represents 8% to 10% of all childhood tumors.

About 15% of all cancer-related deaths in the pediatric age group are related to this disease, with incidence of around 10.2 cases per million children younger than 15 years old and 500 new cases reported every year. 90% of these cases are diagnosed before 5 years of age, but 30% of them are found within the first year of life. The median age for the diagnosis of neuroblastoma is 22 months, being rare in adolescence and adulthood but showing poor prognosis when it does present in those age groups.

The degree of differentiation of neuroblastoma is correlated to the prognosis, with a wide variety of outcomes (from tumor regression to recurrence and mortality). The standard of care is the use of chemotherapy, surgical resection and radiation, although most aggressive neuroblastomas have demonstrated to be resistant to these therapies.

=== Pancreatoblastoma ===
Pancreatoblastoma is a rare form of neoplasia that develops mostly in pediatric patients. This type of malignant neoplasm mimics pancreatic development at 7 weeks of gestation and tends to affect, most commonly, young male children.

The usual signs and symptoms for this disease are an abnormal abdominal mass, along with abdominal pain or obstructive jaundice, but these symptoms are not necessarily specific for pancreatoblastoma and make the diagnosis a more complicated process (no standardised guidelines).

The aggressiveness of the tumors, biologically speaking, makes them often unresectable at the age of diagnosis, therefore requiring other forms of therapy to help shrink the tumor instead of completely resecting it. Surgical intervention is possible in more localized cases.

=== Pleuropulmonary blastoma ===
About 0.5% to 1% of all primary malignant lung tumors are childhood tumors of the lung, making it a rare form of neoplasm.

Pleuropulmonary blastoma is one of the three sub-types of these tumors, which include pulmonary blastoma, fetal adenocarcinoma and pleuropulmonary blastoma. Pleuropulmonary blastomas are characterized by the proliferation of malignant immature mesenchymal cells, constituted by two main histological components (mesenchymal and epithelial) that resemble the lung at week 10 to 16 of gestation.

The symptoms for this disease are non-specific, and radiologic features are not enough to give a definitive diagnosis and instead require histological analysis.

=== Retinoblastoma ===
Retinoblastoma is a rare form of eye neoplasm (found in the retina) that is mostly found in children, being the most common intraocular malignancy of infancy and childhood. The incidence is of one case per every 15,000 to 20,000 live births, and some of the most common symptoms of this disease are leukocoria and strabismus, iris rubeosis, hypopyon, hyphema, buphthalmia, orbital cellulites and exophthalmia.

About sixty percent of cases are unilateral and rarely hereditary, although the remaining 40% where cases are either bilateral or multifocal are always related to hereditary mutations. Hereditary retinoblastoma is related to mutations in the RB1 gene, which not only increase the probability of developing retinoblastoma to about 90%, but also increase the probabilities of developing other forms of cancer.

Chemotherapy, cryotherapy and brachytherapy are common forms of treatment along with laser, and the prognosis is now excellent for most forms of retinoblastoma.

=== Glioblastoma multiforme ===
Glioblastoma multiforme is a form of malignant, grade IV tumor of the central nervous system. Most of diagnosed glioblastoma multiforme cases (around 90% are in fact primary gliomas) arise from normal glial cells by following a multistep oncogenesis process. The remainder are originated from lower grade tumors, and the expansion rate of these is distinctly slower than for primary gliomas.

Glioblastoma has been linked to certain genetic alterations and deregulations, but it mostly occurs spontaneously and its progression is associated with deregulation of the G1/S checkpoints, as well as other genetic abnormalities commonly associated with tumor cells.

Metastases of this cancer type is not usually reported, and the treatment for this disease often includes full tumor resection along with radiotherapy and chemotherapy. Immunotherapy, as well as integrin signaling pathways inhibitors are also useful for its treatment, and the prognosis depends on the localization of the tumor, the degree of malignancy, genetic profile, proliferation rate and patient's age.
