= Ceruminous gland =

Specialized sweat glands in the ear

Ceruminous glands are specialized sweat glands located subcutaneously in the external auditory canal, in the outer third. Ceruminous glands are simple, coiled, tubular glands made up of an inner secretory layer of cells and an outer myoepithelial layer of cells. They are classed as apocrine glands. The glands drain into larger ducts, which then drain into the guard hairs that reside in the external auditory canal. Here they produce cerumen, or earwax, by mixing their secretion with sebum and dead epidermal cells. Cerumen keeps the eardrum pliable, lubricates and cleans the external auditory canal, waterproofs the canal, kills bacteria, and serves as a barrier to trap foreign particles (dust, fungal spores, etc.) by coating the guard hairs of the ear, making them sticky.

These glands are capable of developing both benign and malignant tumors. The benign tumors include ceruminous adenoma, ceruminous pleomorphic adenoma, and ceruminous syringocystadenoma papilliferum. The malignant tumors include ceruminous adenocarcinoma, adenoid cystic carcinoma, and mucoepidermoid carcinoma.

== See also ==
- List of specialized glands within the human integumentary system
- List of distinct cell types in the adult human body
