= Papillary hidradenoma =

- Other names: Hidradenoma papilliferum
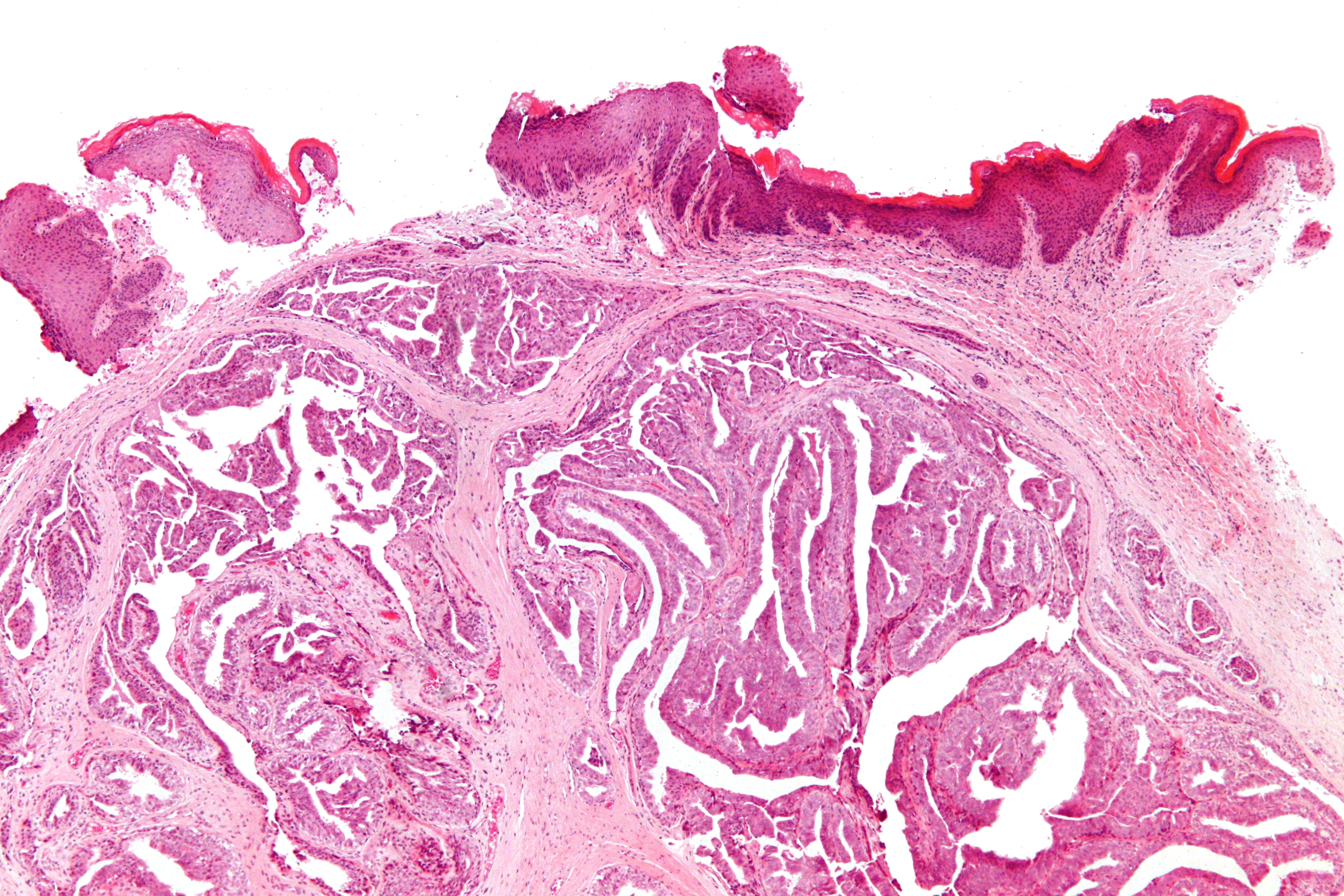
- Micrograph of a papillary hidradenoma with papillary structures; fragmented overlying epidermis is at the top of the image. H&E stain.
- Specialty: Gynecology, dermatology
- Symptoms: Mass in the genital or other area
- Treatment: Surgical removal
- Prognosis: Excellent

A papillary hidradenoma, also termed hidradenoma papilliferum or mammary-like gland adenoma of the vulva, is a rare, but nonetheless most common benign tumor that occurs in and between anal and genital regions (i.e. anogenital area) of females. These hidradenomas are sharply circumscribed, nodular tumors that usually develop in women's anogenital area (particularly the vulva) but uncommonly occur in other sites in women and men. Papillary hidradenomas that develop outside of the anogenital region are termed ecctopic papillary hidradenomas or ectopic hidradenoma papilliferums.

Anogenital papillary hidradenomas are regarded as tumors that form in anogenital mammary–like glands (MLAGs); MLAGs are a type of apocrine gland. MLAGs were once classified as abnormally located breast tissue glands (see accessory breast tissue@ https://doi.org/10.53347/rID-11125) but are now considered to be normal components of the anogenital region. Microscopically, papillary hidradenomas often resemble certain types of breast tumors. Ectopic papillary hidradenomas are thought to be tumors of apocrine glands which have an as yet unclear relationship to MLAGs.

Typically, papillary hidradenomas are solitary, slow-growing, small tumors that may have been present for months to many years before the time of diagnosis. The tumors are usually symptomless but may be intermittently or constantly painful, become ulcerated, and exhibit minor levels of bleeding. The pain resulting from these tumors may be simple tenderness, more or less constant usually mild pain, or, in females, dyspareunia, i.e. pain during and just after sexual intercourse.

Rarely, papillary hidradenomas have progressed to what appear to be 1) in situ malignancies (i.e. malignancies that have neither metastasized nor invaded beyond the layer of tissue where they arose); 2) locally invasive malignancies; or 3) complex tumors intermixed with other malignancies such as extramammary Paget disease, melanoma, and squamous cell carcinoma. Furthermore, benign papillary hidradenoma tumors may be confused clinically with cancerous tumors and recent studies have indicated that other types of tumors have often been mistakenly diagnosed as papillary hidradenomas. Papillary hidradenomas, particularly ectopic papillary hidradenomas, require further study to better define the criteria for their diagnosis.

== Presentation ==
In a review of 264 women diagnosed with anogenital papillary hidradenomas, patients ranged in age from 25 to 82 years (median: 49 years); in 25 cases where the information was available, the tumors had been present for 2–120 months (median: 12 months) with 13 patients reporting their tumor's presence for less than 1 year before diagnosis. All patients had a solitary tumor in the anogenital area except for one patient who presented with four clustered tumors. Most tumors involved the vulva (71.6%) and areas around the anus (14%) or space between the anus and vulva, i.e. the perineum (3.8%). Their lesions ranged in size from 0.2 to 2 centimeters (cm.) in largest dimension (median: 0.7 cm.). Smaller studies on one or a few females with anogenital papillary hidradenomas found that the tumors commonly presented as asymptomatic, well-confined, skin-colored, red, or bluish nodules in women of Caucasian origin between the ages of 25–66 years. The nodules were solid or cystic; 0.4 to 2.5 cm. in widest dimension; and usually located in the grooves (termed interlabial sulci or interlabial folds) between the labia majora and labia minora, the clitoris, or the region between the vulva and anus (i.e. Frenulum of labia minora). Ectopic papillary hidradenomas in women have been reported to occur on the scalp, eyelid, cheek, forehead, face, ear canal, and back. Nearly 50% of ectopic papillary hidradenoma have been diagnosed in men; these have occurred on the thigh, arm, armpit, face and eyelid. While usually symptomless, patients may complain that the tumor is ulcerated, bleeds, or is painful. This pain may be simple tenderness, more or less constant but usually mild, or, in females with anogenital lesions, dyspareunia. The rare cases of ectopic papillary hidradenoma in the external auditory canal have presented with unilateral conductive hearing loss sometimes associated with ear pain, drainage of ear fluid, or weakness of a facial muscle(s).

== Histopathology ==
Microscopic histopathological analyses of papillary hidradenoma tumors typically reveal a nodule in the dermis, i.e. layer of skin between the epidermis and subcutaneous tissue. The tumor consists of complex patterns of interconnecting tubular and papillary (i.e. thin finger-like or frond-like) structures. These structures are lined with glandular epithelial and myoepithelial cells. The glandular epithelial cells appear to be excessively proliferating in the ducts leading to the epidermis and show oxyphilic changes, (i.e. cytoplasm filled with large mitochondria, glycogen, and ribosomes) while the myoepithelial cells often appear clear cell-like, i.e. have uncolored cytoplasm when stained with hematoxylin and eosin. The histopathology of anogenital and ectopic papillary hidradenomas are similar to each other.

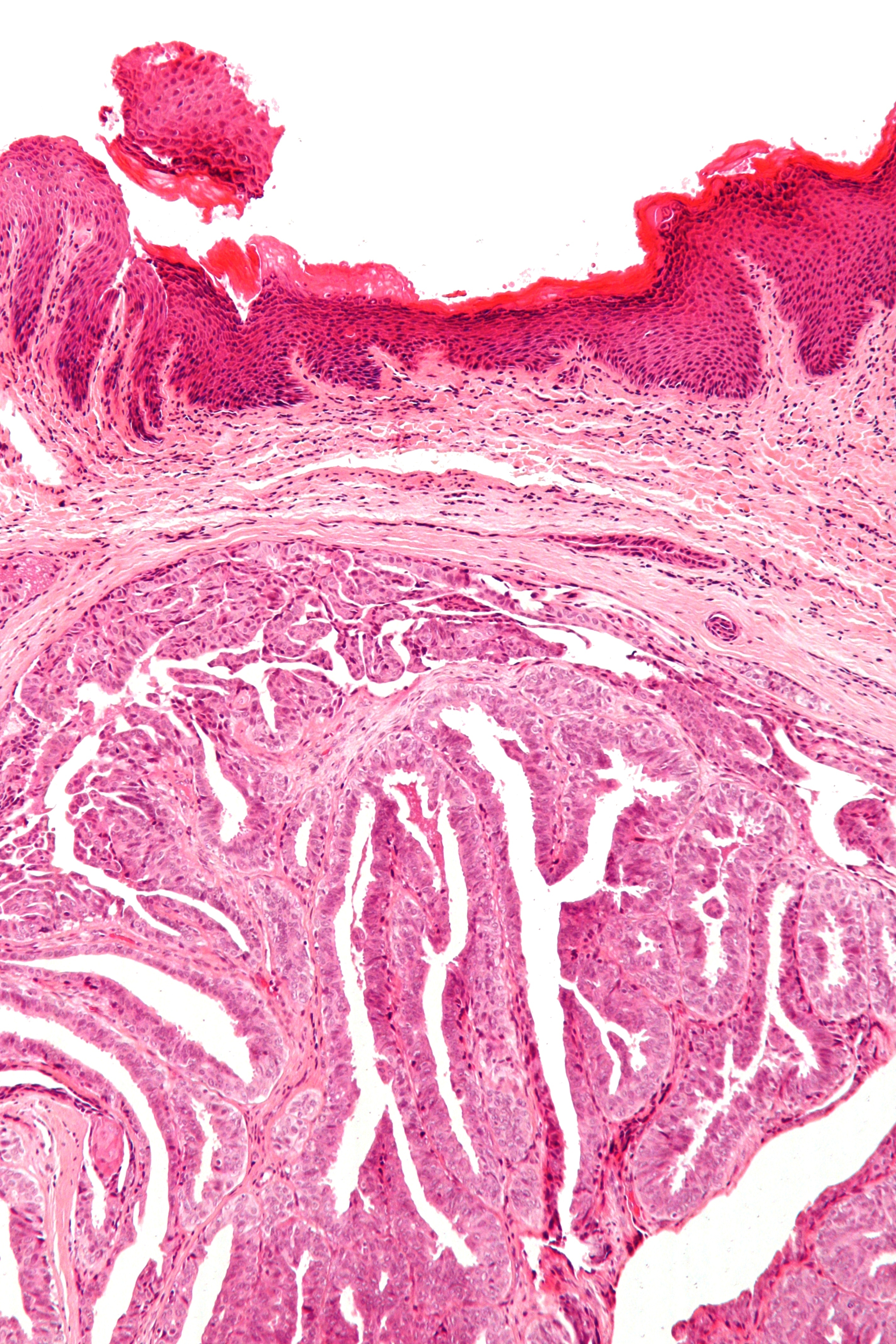
Intermediate magnification

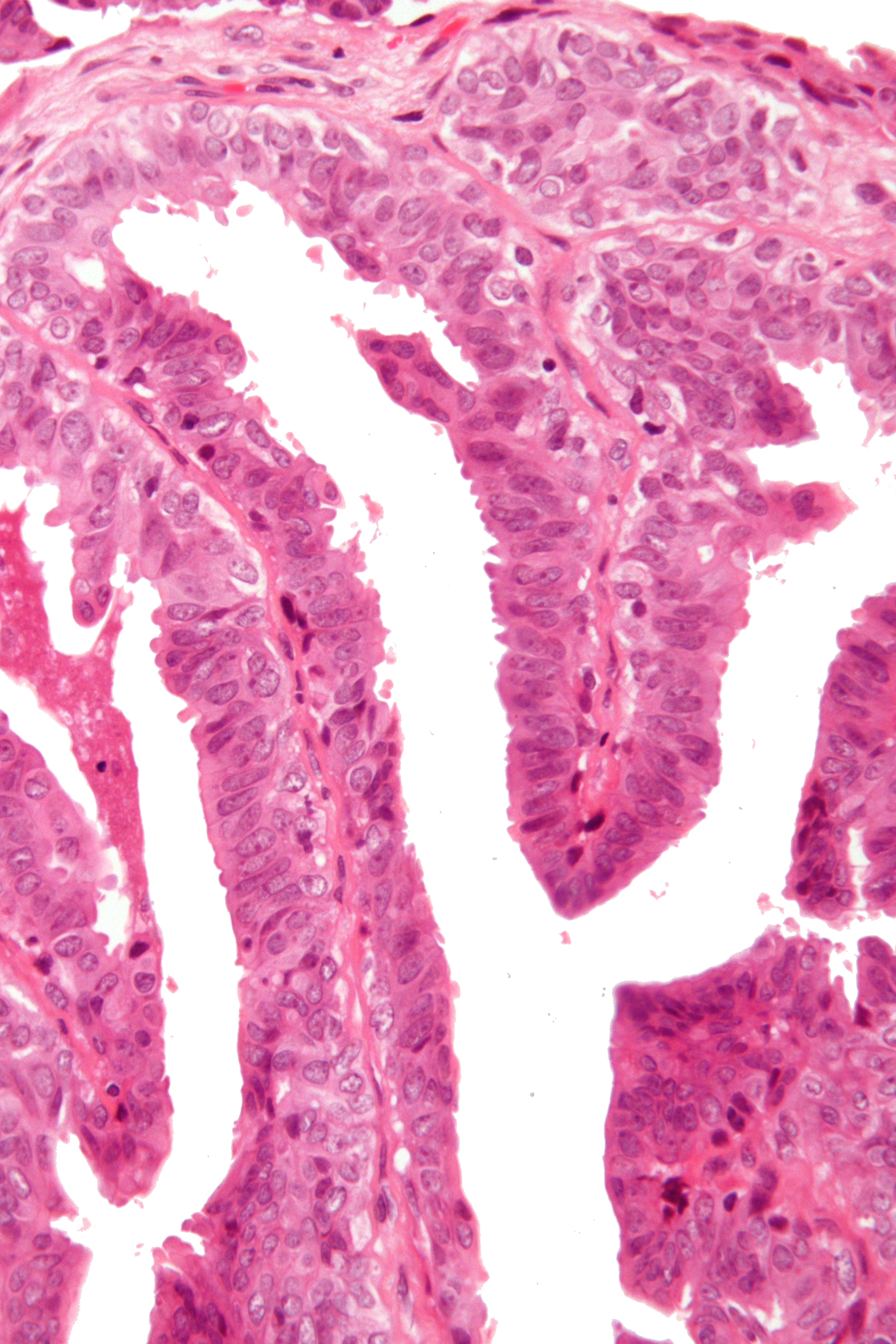
Very high magnification

== Immunohistochemistry ==
Immunohistochemical analyses of anogenital papillary hidradenoma tumors have detected the expression of both the estrogen and progesterone receptors in 18 and the androgen receptor in 4 of 20 cases. In another study of anogenital papillary hidradenomas, expression of the estrogen receptor was restricted to the tumors' glandular epithelial cells while the tumors' myoepithelial cells expressed tumor protein p63 and alpha-smooth muscle actin protein. Presence of the estrogen and progesterone receptors may underlie the female prevalence of anogenital papillary hidradenomas as well as their development in females only after puberty. The anogenital tumor cells may also express vimentin, various cytokeratin proteins, and in a minority of cases the DNA of human papillomavirus (infection by this virus and the presence of its DNA does not appear involved in the development of papillary hidradenoma). These immunohistochemistry findings have not as yet been reported in atypical papillary hidradenomas.

== Gene and signaling pathway abnormalities ==
Several studies have reported the presence in anogenital papillary hidradenoma tumor cells of mutations in one or multiple genes that lead to the production of proteins that directly or indirectly stimulate the PI3K/AKT/mTOR intracellular signaling pathway. The mutated genes include PIK3CA, AKT1, PIK3CA, MAGI1, SYNE1, USP9X, KLNI (also termed CASC5), RNF213, FLCN, PDGFRB, AR (i.e. the androgen receptor gene), BTK, MLL3, KAT6A, BRD3, EP400, TET2, IL6, and IL7R. The PI3K/AKT/mTOR pathway promotes the grow (i.e. proliferation) and survival of cells and is abnormally activated in, and appears to contribute to the development and or progression of, a wide range of tumors. While further studies are needed, these findings suggest that the cited mutations lead to stimulation of the PI3K/AKT/mTOR pathway and thereby promote the development and/or progression of anogenital papillary hidradenoma in the majority of cases. These abnormalities have not yet been reported in ectopic papillary hidradenomas.

== Diagnosis ==
The diagnosis of anogenital papillary hidradenoma lesions, while often suggested based on their clinical presentations, must be differentiated from a wide range of other similarly presenting anogenital lesions such as hemorrhoidal disease, anorectal abscesses, virus-related wart-like lesions, sebaceous cysts, mucous cysts, lipomas, neurofibromas, metastatic carcinomas with papillary histopathology, syringocystoadenocarcinoma papilliferum (i.e. malignant syringocystadenoma papilliferum), syringocystadenoma papilliferum, melanomas, eccrine porocarcinomas, squamous cell carcinomas, nodular lesions in extramammary Paget disease, dermatofibroma, focal areas of mucinosis, colloid milium, and sebaceous adenomas. This differentiation is made by finding that a lesion has the histopathological features typical of papillary hidradenomas. However, some cases diagnosed as ectopic papillary hidradenomas, particularly those occurring in men, have subsequently been found to be syringocystadenoma papilliferums or trichoepitheliomas. Further studies are required to better define the criteria for ectopic papillary hidradenomas.

== Treatment and prognosis ==
The treatment of choice for anogenital and ectopic papillary hidradenomas, regardless of their locations, is similar: resection of the tumor while preserving the surrounding structures. Recurrence of these tumors is rare and usually due to incomplete removal of the primary lesion. As of 2021, there has been no reported recurrence of ectopic papillary hidradenomas. Prognosis after complete surgical removal of anogenital and ectopic papillary hidradenomas is excellent.

=== Malignant transformation of papillary hidradenomas ===
Transformations of papillary hidradenomas into malignant forms are extremely rare. Two cases progressed to in situ (malignant cells present in the tumor but have neither metastasized, i.e. spread to distant tissues nor invaded beyond the layer of tissue from where they arose) cancers; two cases appeared to have infiltrated locally but not metastasized; and one case was a rapidly fatal lesion that appeared to be an adenosquamous carcinoma that arose in a papillary hidradenoma. It is not clear that these cases actually represent true progression of papillary hidradenoma into a cancer.

== See also ==
- Hidroacanthoma simplex
- List of cutaneous conditions
