= Mucinous neoplasm =

- Other names: Colloid neoplasm
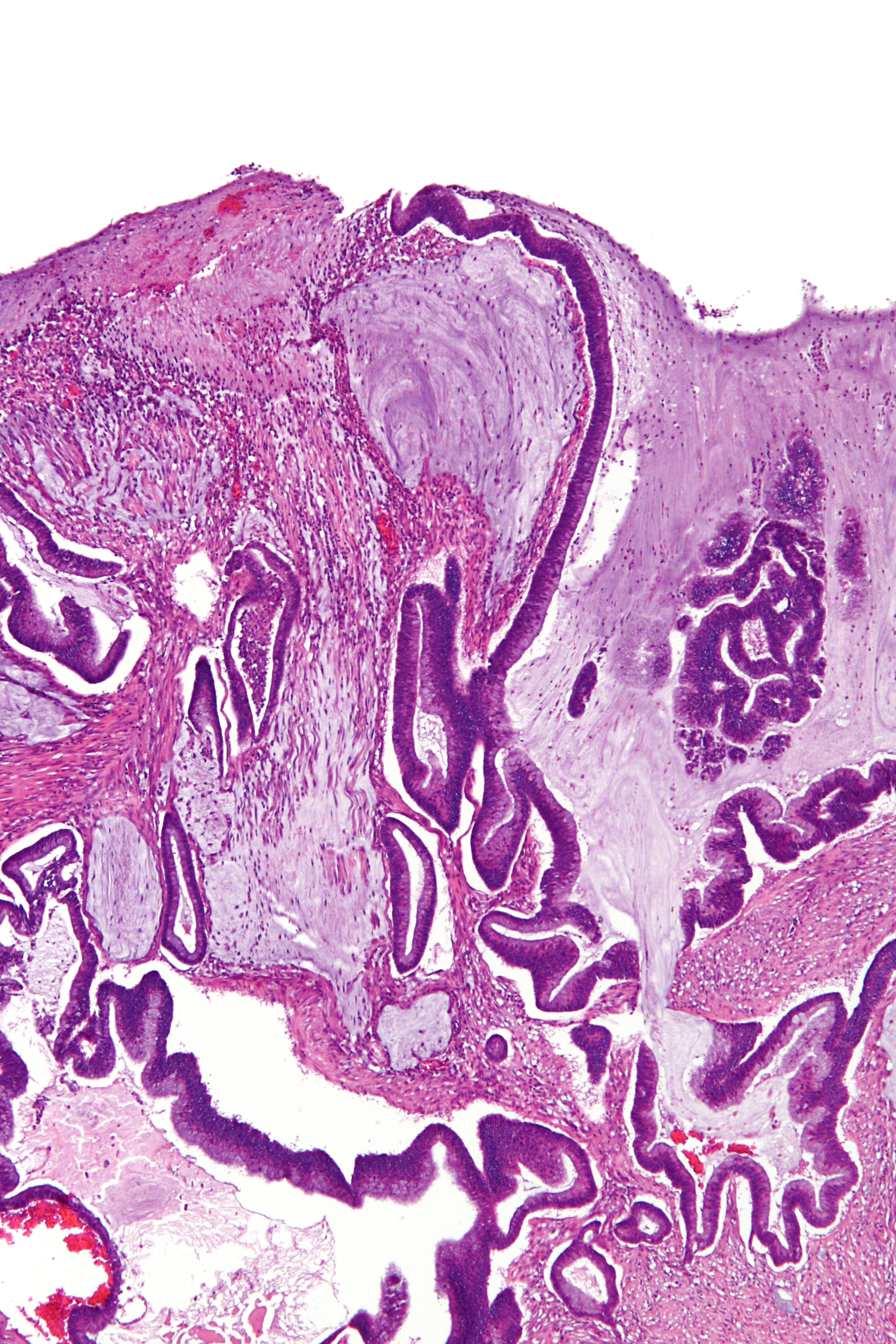
- Micrograph of a mucinous adenocarcinoma of the colon. H&E stain.
- Specialty: Oncology

A mucinous neoplasm (also called colloid neoplasm) is an abnormal and excessive growth of tissue (neoplasia) with associated mucin (a fluid that sometimes resembles thyroid colloid). It arises from epithelial cells that line certain internal organs and skin, and produce mucin (the main component of mucus). A malignant mucinous neoplasm is called a mucinous carcinoma. For example, for ovarian mucinous tumors, approximately 75% are benign, 10% are borderline and 15% are malignant.

== Mucinous carcinoma ==
Over 40 percent of all mucinous carcinomas are colorectal.

When found within the skin, mucinous carcinoma is commonly a round, elevated, reddish, and sometimes ulcerated mass, usually located on the head and neck.

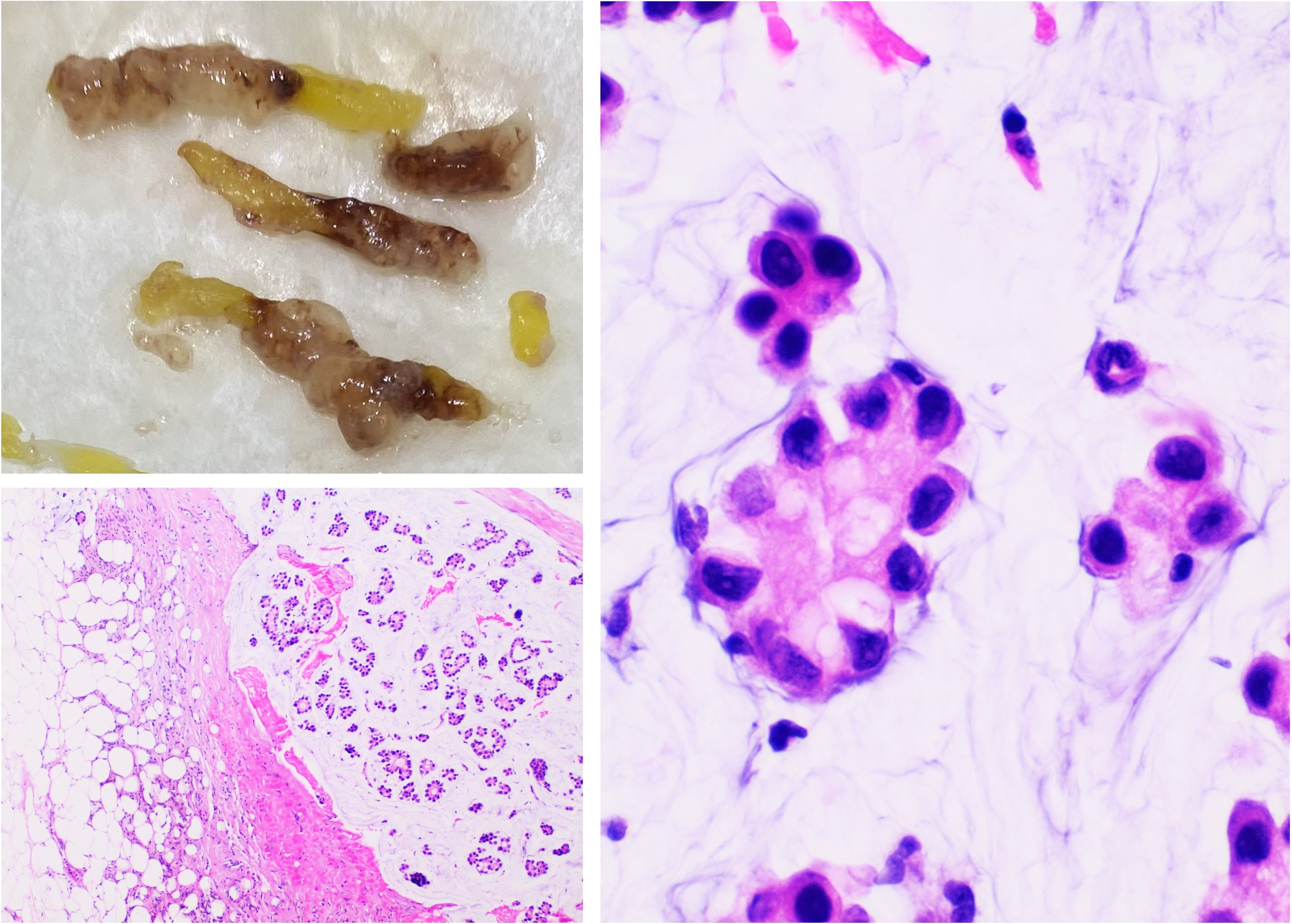
Mucinous carcinoma of the breast: Gross pathology (upper left) of mucinous carcinoma shows gelatinous areas. Histopathology shows clusters or nests of tumor cells floating in pools of extracellular mucin.

== See also ==
- Eccrine carcinoma
- Microcystic adnexal carcinoma
- Primary cutaneous adenoid cystic carcinoma
- List of cutaneous conditions
- Pseudomyxoma peritonei
