= AMER1 =

Protein-coding gene in the species Homo sapiens

Available structures
PDB	Ortholog search: PDBe RCSB
PDB	List of PDB id codes 4YJL, 4YK6, 4YJE

Identifiers
- Aliases: AMER1, FAM123B, OSCS, WTX, APC membrane recruitment protein 1
- External IDs: OMIM: 300647; MGI: 1919595; HomoloGene: 51852; GeneCards: AMER1; OMA:AMER1 - orthologs

Gene location (Human)
Chr.	X chromosome (human)
Band	Xq11.2	Start	64,185,117 bp
Band	Xq11.2	End	64,205,708 bp

Gene location (Mouse)
Chr.	X chromosome (mouse)
Band	X|X C3	Start	94,463,924 bp
Band	X|X C3	End	94,488,478 bp
RNA expression pattern
Bgee	Human / Mouse (ortholog); Top expressed in: muscle of thigh; gastrocnemius muscle; ganglionic eminence; smooth muscle tissue; ventricular zone; left ovary; right ovary; skeletal muscle tissue; stromal cell of endometrium; right lobe of liver / Top expressed in: Rostral migratory stream; umbilical cord; internal carotid artery; otic vesicle; hand; lacrimal gland; retinal pigment epithelium; otolith organ; utricle; abdominal wall; More reference expression data
BioGPS	n/a
Gene ontology
Molecular function	phosphatidylinositol-4,5-bisphosphate binding; beta-catenin binding; protein binding; beta-catenin destruction complex binding; lipid binding
Cellular component	cytoplasm; cytosol; plasma membrane; intracellular membrane-bounded organelle; membrane; nucleus; nuclear body
Biological process	regulation of canonical Wnt signaling pathway; adipose tissue development; bone development; mesenchymal cell differentiation involved in kidney development; positive regulation of protein ubiquitination; negative regulation of canonical Wnt signaling pathway; kidney development; anatomical structure development; positive regulation of canonical Wnt signaling pathway; beta-catenin destruction complex assembly; beta-catenin destruction complex disassembly; Wnt signaling pathway
Sources:Amigo / QuickGO
Orthologs
Species	Human	Mouse
Entrez	139285	72345
Ensembl	ENSG00000184675	ENSMUSG00000050332
UniProt	Q5JTC6	Q7TS75
RefSeq (mRNA)	NM_152424	NM_175179
RefSeq (protein)	NP_689637	NP_780388
Location (UCSC)	Chr X: 64.19 – 64.21 Mb	Chr X: 94.46 – 94.49 Mb
PubMed search
- Wikidata
View/Edit Human	View/Edit Mouse

APC membrane recruitment protein 1 (AMER1) also known as Wilms Tumor on the X (WTX) is a protein that in humans is encoded by the AMER1 gene.

It has been associated with Wilms tumor.
