= Syringocystadenoma papilliferum =

- Other names: Syringadenoma papilliferum, Fistulous vegetative verrucous hydradenoma, Naevus syringocystadenomatosus papilliferus, Papillary syringocystadenoma, and SCAP.
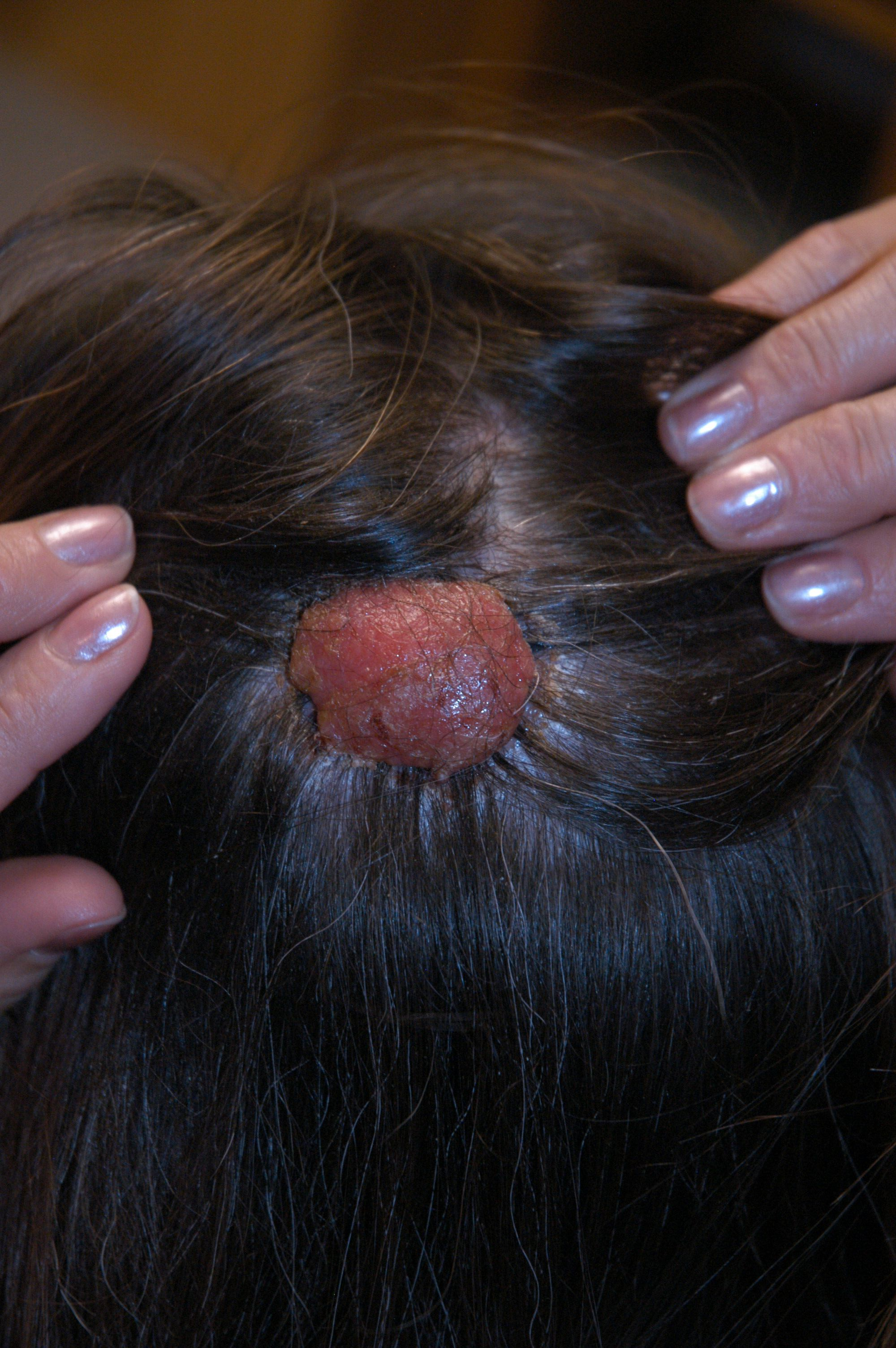
- An example of a syringocystadenoma papilliferum
- Specialty: Dermatology
- Usual onset: Childhood, Neonatal, Infancy, Adolescent.
- Causes: Genetic.
- Diagnostic method: Skin biopsy.
- Differential diagnosis: Hidradenoma papilliferum, Papillary eccrine adenoma, Warty dyskeratoma, Tubular apocrine adenoma, Syringocystadenocarcinoma papilliferum.
- Treatment: Surgical excision.

Syringocystadenoma papilliferum is a rare non-malignant adnexal neoplasm that develops from apocrine or eccrine sweat glands and can be identified histologically by cystic, papillary, and ductal invaginations into the dermis lined by double-layered outer cuboidal and luminal high columnar epithelium and connected to the epidermis.

Lesions have a heterogeneous, non-distinctive appearance that ranges from skin-colored to pink-colored papules or plaques. Typically, lesions form in the head and neck area.

Syringocystadenoma papilliferum can develop de-novo or within a nevus sebaceous. Syringocystadenoma papilliferum tends to be seen in children. It is present at birth in approximately 50% of individuals affected, and it develops before puberty in the remaining 15%-30%.

== Symptoms and Signs ==
Symptoms of Syringocystadenoma papilliferum include papules, lack of hair on the scalp, blisters, subcutaneous nodules, and nevus sebaceous.

Nevus sebaceous is a congenital, hairless plaque composed of overgrown epidermis, sebaceous glands, follicles for hair, apocrine glands, and connective tissue. Sebaceous naevi are most commonly found on the scalp, however they may also be found on the face, neck, or forehead.

== Diagnosis ==
A skin biopsy is used to diagnose syringocystadenoma papilliferum. Characteristics of Syringocystadenoma papilliferum are dilated capillaries and a dense infiltration of plasma cells.

Differential diagnoses include papillary eccrine adenoma, warty dyskeratoma, tubular apocrine adenoma, and hidradenoma papilliferum.

== See also ==
- List of cutaneous conditions
- Hidradenoma papilliferum
- Papillary eccrine adenoma
- List of cutaneous conditions associated with increased risk of nonmelanoma skin cancer
