= Microcystic adnexal carcinoma =

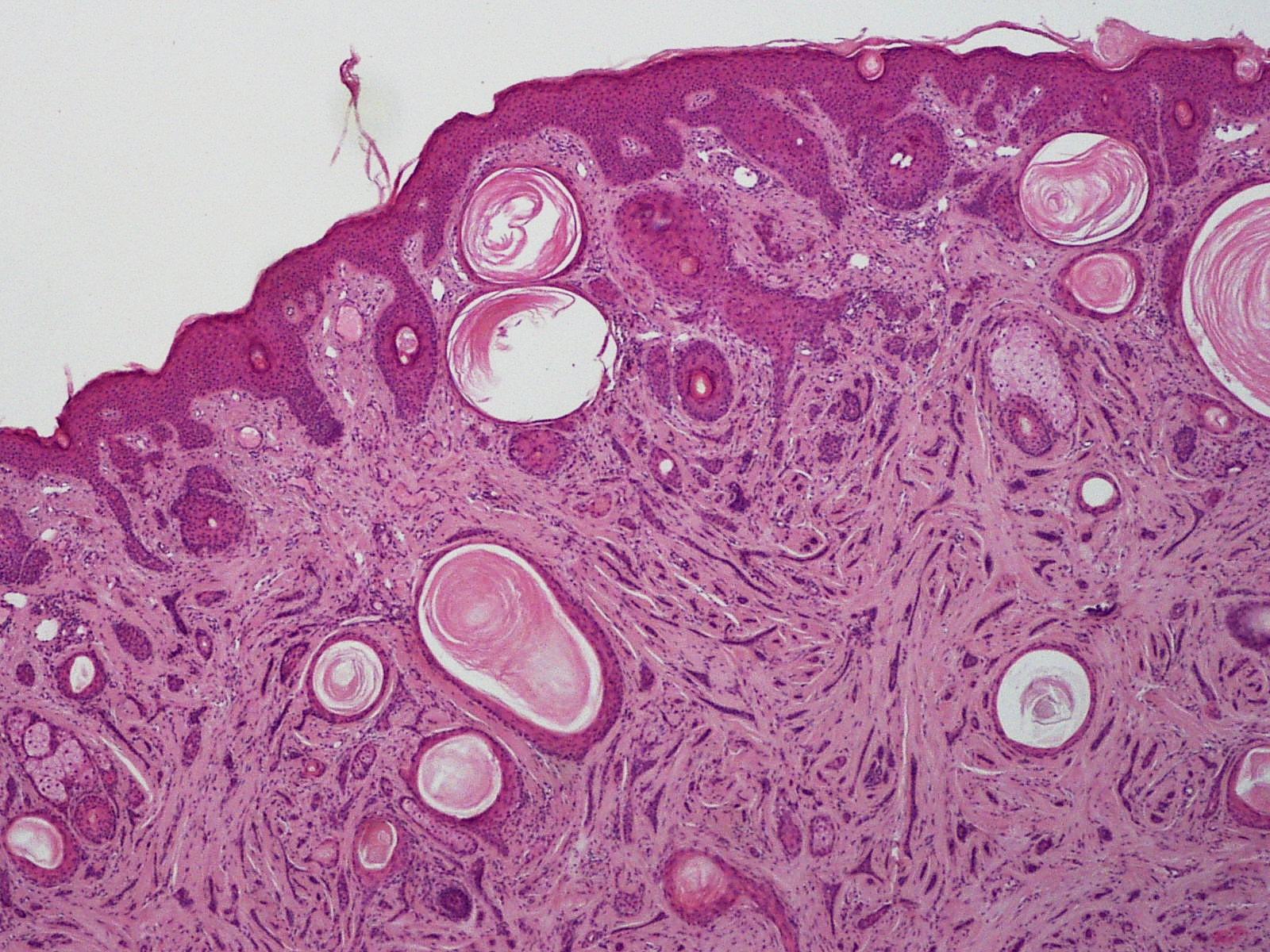
- A microscopic view of microcystic adnexal carcinoma
- Specialty: Dermatology/oncology

Microcystic adnexal carcinoma (MAC) is a rare sweat gland cancer, which often appears as a yellow spot or bump in the skin. It usually occurs in the neck or head, although cases have been documented in other areas of the body. Most diagnosis occur past the age of 50. Although considered an invasive cancer, metastasis rarely occurs. If the tumor spreads, it can grow and invade fat, muscles, and other types of tissue. Main treatments are wide local excision or Mohs micrographic surgery, which ensures that most, if not all, cancer cells are removed surgically.

== Presentation ==
MACs usually present as a smooth, flesh or yellow colored, slow-growing nodule or bump somewhere on the face or neck with typical development being 3–5 years. The most common location is the mouth (occurring in 74% of cases), however cases have been documented on the scalp, tongue, trunk, upper extremities, and genitals. Patients are more likely to be white, female, and middle aged or elderly, although cases have been documented in children.

Although usually presenting with no visual or physical symptoms, some patients do experience numbness, paresthesia, burning, or tingling. This may be due to the invasive nature of MACs, which can burrow deep into underlying tissues and nerves in the face. MAC is very difficult to recognize and differentiate from other conditions. Specialists may suggest a series of tests including a biopsy, an MRI, or a CT scan. The average tumor size is less than 2 cm, however cases have been documented where tumor size exceeds 7.9 cm. While death is rare among MAC patients, it can occasionally metastasize to local lymph nodes. The 10 year overall survival rate is 86.4%, however this is exceedingly close to many 10 year survival rates of populations without MACs present.

== Causes ==
Little is known about the causes of MACs, although some evidence has shown that ultraviolet light, radiation, and genes may be causation factors. A genetic role might also be plausible, according to some studies. In several cases, patients developed a MAC after immunosuppression.

== Treatment ==
Due to the invasive nature of MACs, most cases are treated with wide local excision in order to decrease the rate of reoccurrence. Increasingly however, Mohs micrographic surgery is being employed as it allows more specific margins to be removed, along with decreasing the size of postoperative scars and disfigurement. In rare cases, tumors can be deemed inoperable due to their size and location under vital structures of the face. Chemotherapy and radiation treatment have been used when metastasis has occurred or when an excision cannot be performed, but results have been inconclusive about their effectiveness. In some cases, radiation therapy has been shown to increase tumor size. While in other cases, it implies that it will decrease the success of the tumor regrowing. Long term follow-up is necessary, as some cases of local recurrence have been documented 30 years after the original diagnosis.

== See also ==
- Syringofibroadenoma
- Skin lesion
- List of cutaneous conditions
