= Eccrine carcinoma =

- Other names: Syringoid carcinoma
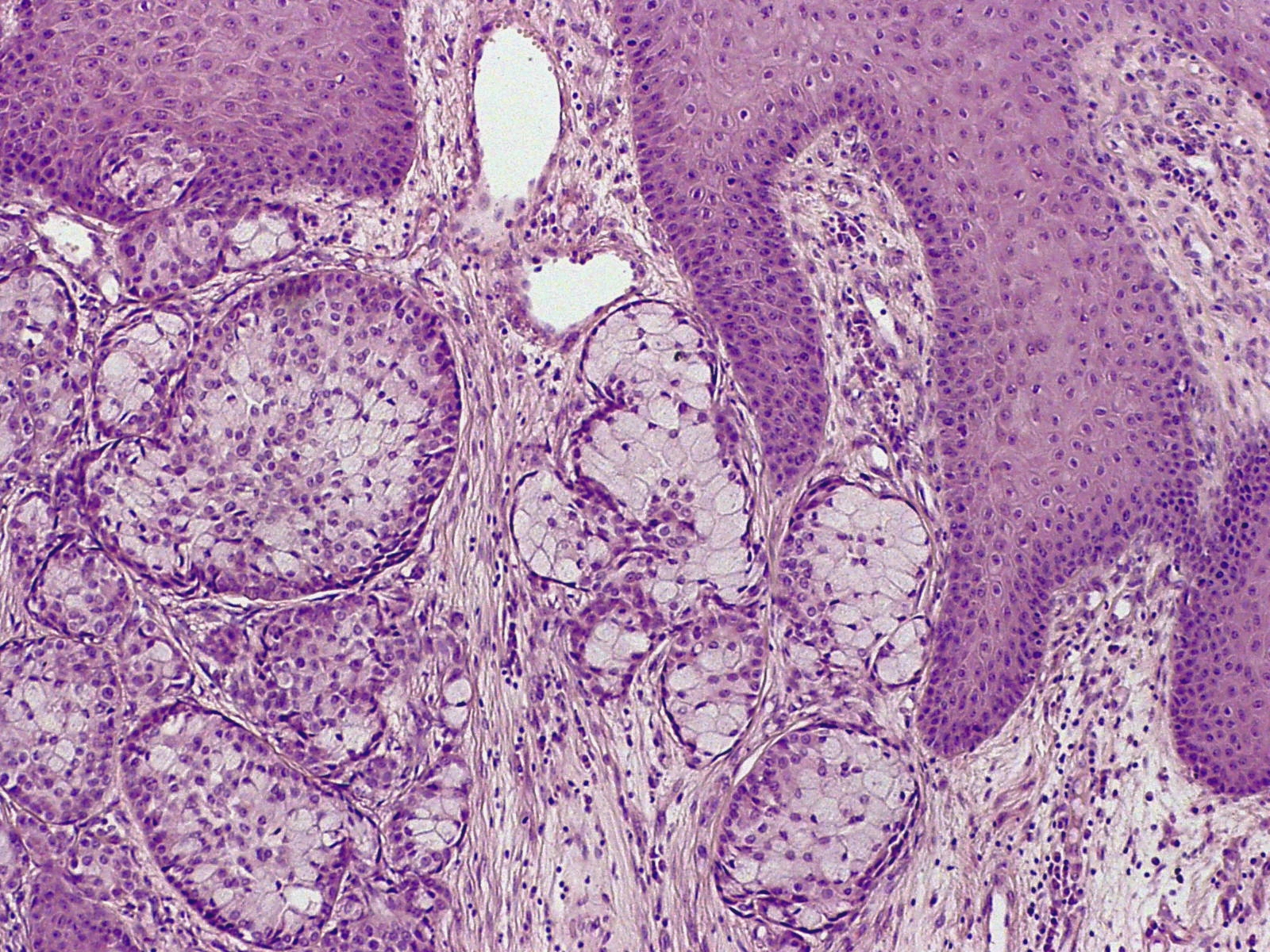
- Eccrine carcinoma, alveolar type
- Specialty: Dermatology

Eccrine carcinoma is a rare skin condition characterized by a plaque or nodule on the scalp, trunk, or extremities. It originates from the eccrine sweat glands of the skin, accounting for less than 0.01% of diagnosed cutaneous malignancies. Eccrine carcinoma tumors are locally aggressive, with a high rate of recurrence. Lack of reliable immunohistochemical markers and similarity to other common tumors has made identification of eccrine carcinoma difficult.

Most eccrine carcinomas which have not spread can be cured by wide local excision. However, metastatic disease carries a poor prognosis.

== Symptoms ==
Eccrine carcinoma results in brown, bluish, erythematous skin lesions across the body. Common regions where lesions are found are in the lower extremities (35%), head and neck (24%), and upper extremities (14%).

== Complications ==
Metastases and/or antagonistic side effects can occur after surgical excision of tumors.

== Types ==
Eccrine carcinomas include porocarcinoma, hidradenocarcinoma, malignant spiradenoma carcinoma, malignant cylindroma, syringoid eccrine carcinoma, microcystic adnexal carcinoma, mucinous carcinoma, adenoid cystic carcinoma, and ductal papillary adenocarcinoma. Other tumors not classified include eccrine ductal carcinoma, basaloid eccrine carcinoma, clear cell eccrine carcinoma and non-specified sweat gland carcinomas.

== Causes ==
There is no research yet as to what causes Eccrine carcinoma.

== Diagnosis ==
A skin biopsy is the most common test used to diagnose eccrine carcinoma. The biopsy will detect growth of new or abnormal tissue. Another test that can be performed is using immunohistochemistry, but it is inconsistent. Markers used to detect eccrine carcinoma consist of carcinoembryonic antigen, progesterone receptors, estrogen receptors, epithelial membrane antigen, pancytokeratins, and cytokeratin 7.

== Treatment ==
Wide surgical excision is the mainstay of treatment. Chemotherapy and radiation therapy have been used in metastatic disease.

== Prognosis ==
In the absence of metastasis, local excision is curative in 70–80% of cases. Metastatic eccrine carcinoma has a relative mortality rate of 65% (with local lymph node involvement alone) to 80% (with distant metastases), and the 10-year overall survival rate is 9%.

== Frequency ==
Eccrine carcinoma accounts for 0.005-0.01% of diagnosed cutaneous malignancies.

== See also ==
- Microcystic adnexal carcinoma
- Skin lesion
