= Ceruminous adenoma =

Tumor of the external ear

- Other names: Adenoma of the ceruminous gland and ceruminoma

A ceruminous adenoma is a benign glandular neoplasm which arises from the ceruminous glands located within the external auditory canal. These glands are found within the outer one third to one half of the external auditory canal, more common along the posterior surface; therefore, the tumor develops within a very specific location.

== Signs and symptoms ==
Ceruminous adenoma are rare tumors, accounting for less than 1% of all external ear tumors. The patients will present with a mass, perhaps associated pain, and may have changes in hearing (usually a sensorineural or a conductive hearing loss). Some patients have tinnitus. Nerve paralysis is very uncommon.

== Pathology findings ==
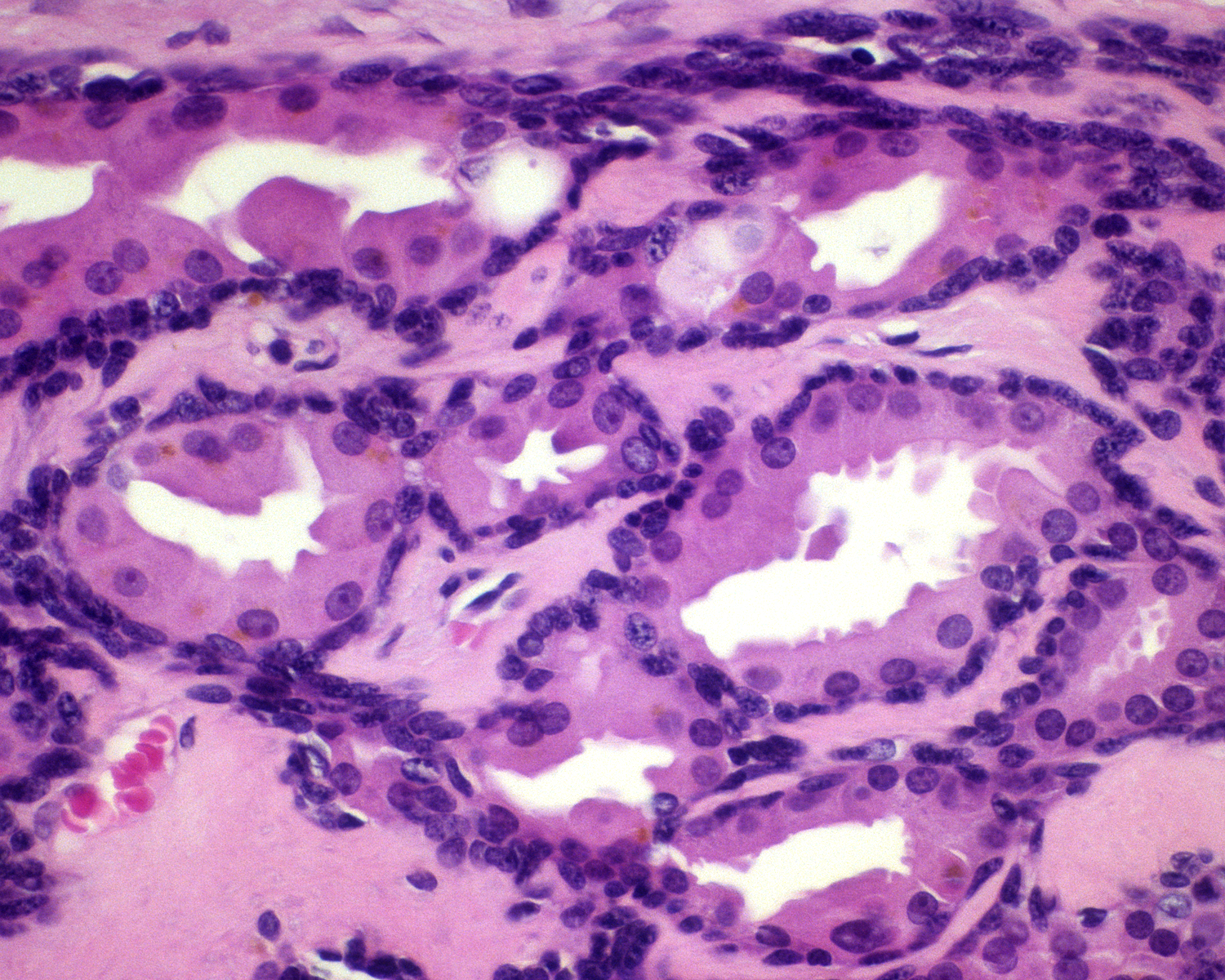
Hematoxylin and eosin stained slides shows a biphasic glandular proliferation with inner apocrine cells and basal myoepithelial cells, separated by fibrous connective tissue stroma.

The tumors are usually small, with a mean size of about 1.2 cm. The tumors are separated into three histologic types based on the dominant findings:

- Ceruminous adenoma
- Ceruminous pleomorphic adenoma
- Ceruminous syringocystadenoma papilliferum

All of the tumors are unencapsulated, but are usually well defined or circumscribed. The overlying surface epithelium is not involved. The tumor shows a dual or biphasic appearance, with glandular or cystic spaces showing inner luminal secretory cells with abundant granular, eosinophilic cytoplasm subtended by basal, myoepithelial cells at the periphery, adjacent to the basement membrane. The luminal cells will often have decapitation (apocrine) secretions and will also have yellow-brown, ceroid, lipofuscin-like (cerumen) pigment granules. There is no pleomorphic, limited mitoses, and no necrosis.

Immunohistochemistry can be performed to confirm the biphasic nature of the tumor. All cells are positive with pancytokeratin and epithelial membrane antigen; only the luminal cells are positive with CK7; only the basal cells are positive with CK5/6, p63, S100 protein. CD117 can be positive in either population. The cells are negative with chromogranin, synaptophysin and CK20.

== Diagnosis ==
The major diagnosis from which to separate ceruminous adenoma is ceruminous adenocarcinoma, which shows an infiltrative growth, pleomorphism, mitoses, necrosis, and lacks ceroid pigment granules. Other tumors which need to be excluded include a neuroendocrine adenoma of the middle ear (middle ear adenoma), paraganglioma, and endolymphatic sac tumor.

== Management ==
The tumors are usually removed in small pieces due to the anatomic confines of the area.

== Prognosis ==
Patients treated with complete surgical excision can expect an excellent long term outcome without any problems. Recurrences may be seen in tumors which are incompletely excised.

== Epidemiology ==
While there is a wide age range at clinical presentation (12–85 years), most patients come to clinical attention at 55 years (mean). There is no gender difference.
