= Salivary serous cell =

Watery-saliva producing cells of the salivary glands

- Schematic representation of a generic salivary gland structure

Details
- Pronunciation: /ˈsæl.əˌver.i ˈsɪr.əs sel/
- System: Digestive system
- Location: Salivary glands (mainly parotid and submandicular)
- Shape: Pyramidal
- Function: Protein-rich saliva secretion

Serous acinar cells of the salivary glands, or more concisely, salivary serous cells, are cells that produce watery, enzyme-rich saliva. Together with salivary mucous cells, these cells secrete most of the fluid that becomes saliva. The term serous refers to the fact that the fluid produced is thin and watery like serum (blood plasma without clotting proteins).

== Secretion of saliva ==
In the salivary glands, fluid is primarily secreted into small cavities surrounded by a small clusters of 8-12 cells, called an acinus (plural: acini), and these cells are often referred to as acinar cells. In the acini of the salivary glands, the serous acinar cells secrete a watery fluid with a high concentration of proteins such as enzymes (like α-Amylase) and anti-microbial proteins (like lactoperoxidase), unlike the mucous acinar cells, which produce thicker mucus-rich fluid. After secretion, the secreted fluid passes through a series of ducts which are lined with cells that further modify its composition and eventually release the finished saliva into the mouth.

== Stimulation of secretion ==
Stimulation of saliva release can be triggered by the autonomic nervous system and several reflexes, including the gustatory-salivary reflex (triggered by taste receptors) and the masticatory-salivary reflex (triggered by the sensation of chewing). Nervous system signals trigger a series of effects, including acinar cell secretion, myoepithelial cell contraction, and vasodilation or vasoconstriction.

Individual salivary acinar cells are often innervated by (connected to) nerves of both the sympathetic and parasympathetic nervous system. Parasympathetic activation triggers a greater secretion of water and electrolytes, while sympathetic activation triggers the secretion of less saliva volume leading to more protein-dense saliva.

Parasympathetic activation of acinar cells is primarily triggered though the neurotransmitter acetylcholine activating M1 and M3 receptors, but there is also contribution by vasoactive intestinal peptide (VIP), another neurotransmitter of parasympathetic origin. Sympathetic activation, on the other hand, primarily occurs via noradrenaline and the activation of the alpha-1 and beta-1 adrenergic receptors.

M1, M3, and alpha-1 receptors are primarily responsible for fluid and electrolyte release, while the VIP and beta-1 receptors are primarily responsible for exocytosis and protein release. The neurotransmitter nitric oxide may also contribute to protein secretion in acinar cells.

In many non-human animals, substance P can trigger a large amount of saliva secretion, but this is not the case in humans where the acinar cells of the largest salivary glands, parotid and submandibular, lack this type of innervation. However, the (minor) human labial salivary glands appear to possess this type of innervation, and so substance P may play some part in the saliva they secrete.

== Location in the body ==
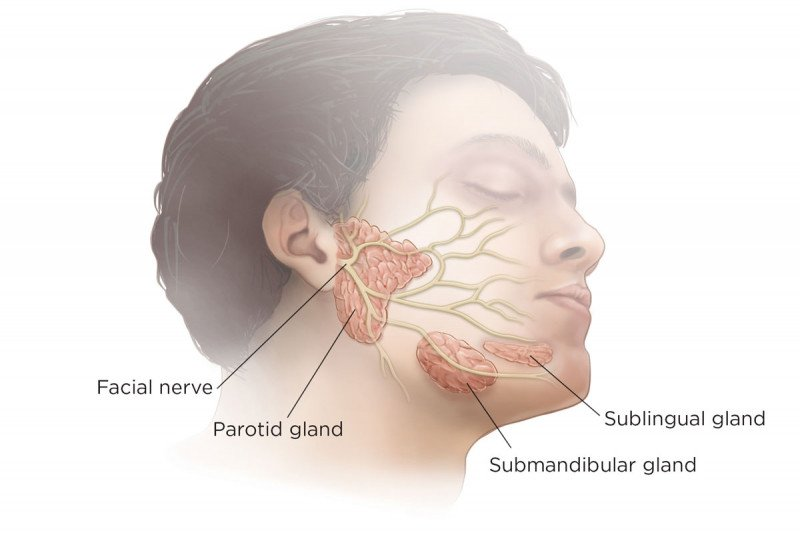
Major salivary glands in humans

In humans (and rodents), there are 3 major paired salivary glands and ~600-1000 smaller minor salivary glands. Serous acinar cells are primarily found in the parotid gland and the submandibular gland, while they are almost completely absent in the sublingual gland and most of the minor glands.

The parotid gland is the largest of the salivary glands, and possesses acinar cells that are almost exclusively of the serous type. It produces around 50% of human saliva to help with digestion when stimulated, but only about 20% of saliva when resting. Consequently, the saliva it produces is watery and full of the enzyme α-Amylase, which helps break down carbohydrates.

The submandibular gland produces the majority (~65%) of saliva in the resting state. It has a mix of serous and mucous acinar cells, and so the saliva it produces is thicker and full of mucus. In the submandibular gland, some acini are predominantly serous acinar cells (serous glands) or predominantly mucous acinar cells (mucous glands), while others are a mix (seromucous glands).

The other salivary glands produce the last 10-15% of saliva, and mainly possess mucous acinar cells. An exception is the set of Von Ebner glands, minor salivary glands located in the tongue that are primarily serous glands.

== Cell structure ==
Serous acinar cells are roughly pyramid shape, with the apex of the pyramid pointing towards to the center of the (roughly spherical) acinus. Inside of the cell on the side with the apex, there are specialize saliva-material containing structures called secretory granules. Compared to mucous acinar cells, their nuclei is more round, and centrally located.

== Incomplete list of secreted proteins ==
- α-Amylase (1A, 1B, 1C) – begins break down of carbohydrates, especially starch.
- Antileukoproteinase (SLPI) – antimicrobial protein that acts as a protease inhibitor. It is also found in mucous membranes located in other parts of the body.
- Carbonic anhydrase 6 (CA6) – enzyme that can convert carbonic acid into water and CO_{2}, which may function to regulate saliva pH.
- Histatin (HTN1, HTN3) – have a variety of roles from inhibiting fungus growth, acting as precursors for enamel, and promoting wound healing.
- Lactoperoxidase – reacts with thiocyanate ions to produce antimicrobial molecules.
- Lactoferrin – antimicrobial protein that binds to iron, and is also found in high concentrations in milk.
- Proline rich proteins – inhibit calcium phosphate crystal formation and provide a suitable environment for enamel protection and repair.
  - Basic (1, 2, 3, 4)
  - Acidic (1, 2)
  - Proline-rich protein 4 (PRR4) – also produced by lacrimal acinar cells
- Statherin – helps stabilize saliva and prevent calcium precipitation.

=== Seromucous acinar cells ===
Some serous acinar cells outside of the parotid and lingual glands also produce small amounts of mucins:

- MUC7 – mucin released by both seromucous and mucous cells which is non-geling and smaller than MUC5B, the primary gel-forming mucin of the salivary mucous cells.

=== In other animals ===
- Lingual lipase – Rats and mice secrete a type of lipase (fat-digesting enzyme) from the Von Ebner's glands which are located at the back of the tongue. The analogous enzyme in humans is secreted in the stomach and called gastric lipase (LIPF).

== Medical significance ==
About half of people receiving radiation therapy in the head and neck region experience dry mouth (xerostomia or hyposalivation) as a side effect, which can be irreversible for high doses (>60 Gray). Early in treatment, direct damage is primarily to the serous acinar cells of the serous acini, but the therapy can also damage the surrounding blood vessels and nerves. This can be mitigated through parotid/submandibular gland sparing intensity-modulated radiotherapy (IMRT), though damage to the minor salivary glands is hard to avoid. When reversible, salivary gland function typically takes 6-12 months to recover.

== Serous demilune ==
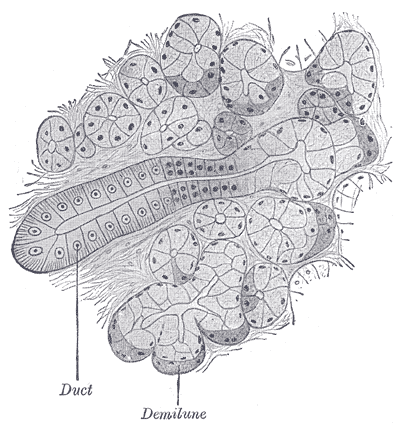
Salivary acini with serous demilunes shown

In many histological preparations of the submandibular gland, the serous acinar cells located in the hybrid seromucous acini are pushed out from between the mucous acinar cells, and appear as crescent-shaped demilunes located at the back of the acini. This fixation artifact can be avoided by rapid-freezing fixation.
