= Salivary gland =

Exocrine glands that produce saliva through a system of ducts

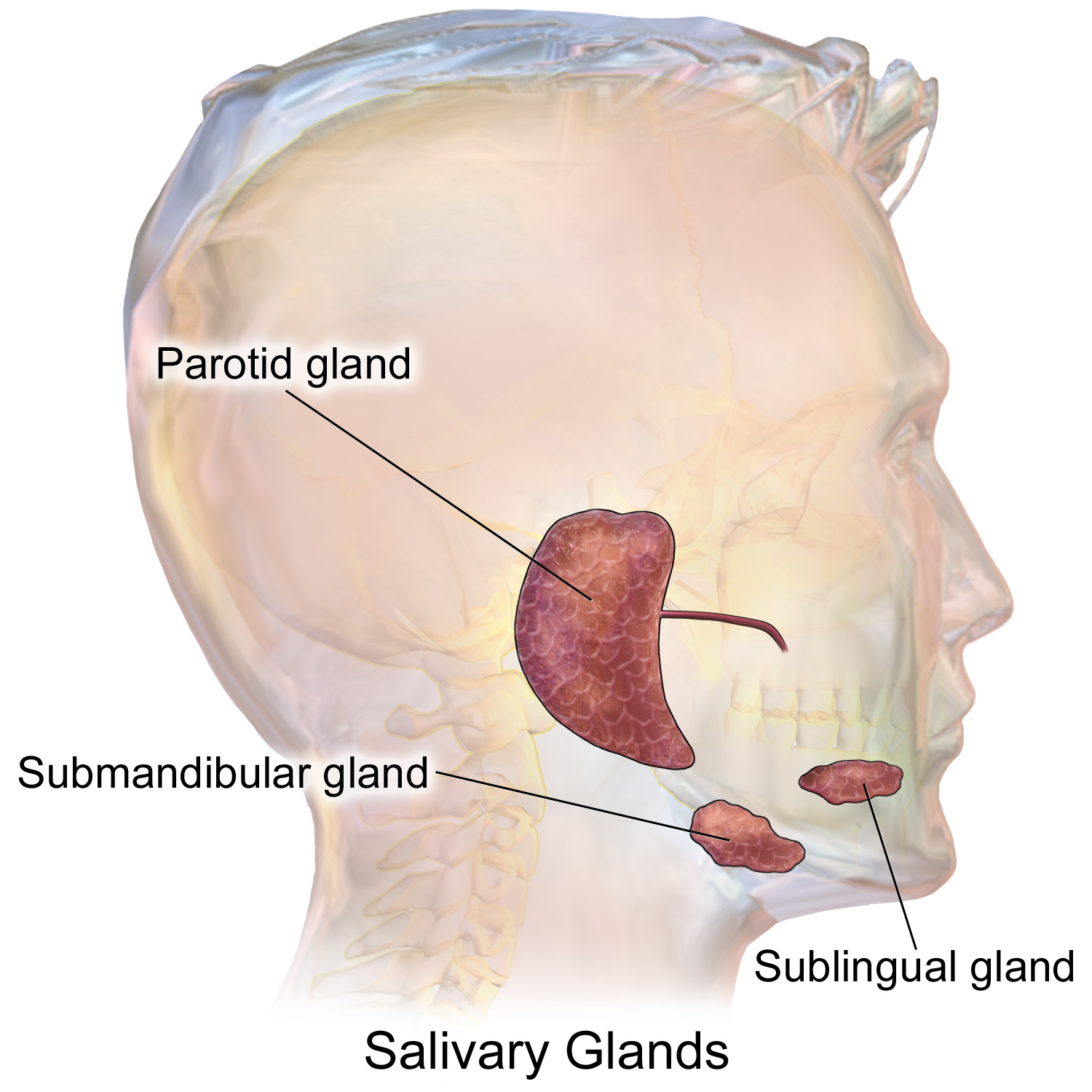
- The three main paired salivary glands.

Details
- System: Digestive system

Identifiers
- Latin: glandulae salivariae
- MeSH: D012469
- TA98: A05.1.02.002; A05.1.02.013
- TA2: 2798
- FMA: 9597 95971, 9597

The salivary glands in many vertebrates including mammals are exocrine glands that produce saliva through a system of ducts. Humans have three paired major salivary glands (parotid, submandibular, and sublingual), as well as hundreds of minor salivary glands. Salivary glands can be classified as serous, mucous, or seromucous (mixed).

In serous secretions, the main type of protein secreted is alpha-amylase, an enzyme that breaks down starch into maltose and glucose, whereas in mucous secretions, the main protein secreted is mucin, which acts as a lubricant.

In humans, 1200 to 1500 milliliters of saliva are produced every day. The secretion of saliva (salivation) is mediated by parasympathetic stimulation; acetylcholine is the active neurotransmitter and binds to muscarinic receptors in the glands, leading to increased salivation.

A proposed fourth pair of salivary glands, the tubarial glands, were first identified in 2020. They are named for their location, being positioned in front of and over the torus tubarius. However, this finding from one study is yet to be confirmed.

== Structure ==
=== Parotid glands ===
The two parotid glands are major salivary glands wrapped around the mandibular ramus in humans. These are largest of the salivary glands, secreting saliva to facilitate mastication and swallowing, and amylase to begin the digestion of starches. It is the serous type of gland which secretes alpha-amylase (also known as ptyalin). It enters the oral cavity via the parotid duct. The glands are located posterior to the mandibular ramus and anterior to the mastoid process of the temporal bone. They are clinically relevant in dissections of facial nerve branches while exposing the different lobes, since any iatrogenic lesion will result in either loss of action or strength of muscles involved in facial expression. They produce 25% of the total salivary content in the oral cavity. Mumps is a viral infection, caused by infection in the parotid gland.

=== Submandibular glands ===
The submandibular glands (previously known as submaxillary glands) are a pair of major salivary glands located beneath the lower jaws, superior to the digastric muscles. The secretion produced is a mixture of both serous fluid and mucus, and enters the oral cavity via the submandibular duct or Wharton duct. Around 70% of saliva in the oral cavity is produced by the submandibular glands, though they are much smaller than the parotid glands. This gland can usually be felt via palpation of the neck, as it is in the superficial cervical region and feels like a rounded ball. It is located about two fingers above the Adam's apple (laryngeal prominence) and about two inches apart under the chin.

=== Sublingual glands ===
The sublingual glands are a pair of major salivary glands located inferior to the tongue, anterior to the submandibular glands. The secretion produced is mainly mucous in nature, but it is categorized as a mixed gland. Unlike the other two major glands, the ductal system of the sublingual glands does not have intercalated ducts and usually does not have striated ducts, either, so saliva exits directly from 8-20 excretory ducts known as the Rivinus ducts. About 5% of saliva entering the oral cavity comes from these glands.

=== Tubarial salivary glands ===
The tubarial glands are suggested as a fourth pair of salivary glands situated posteriorly in the nasopharynx and nasal cavity, predominantly with mucous glands, and its ducts opening into the dorsolateral pharyngeal wall. The glands were unknown until September 2020, when they were discovered by a group of Dutch scientists using prostate-specific membrane antigen PET-CT. This discovery may explain mouth dryness after radiotherapy despite the avoidance of the three major glands. However, these findings from just one study need to be confirmed. On the other hand, an interdisciplinary group of scientists disagree with this new discovery. They believe that an accumulation of minor salivary glands has been described. The researchers examined the scans and confirmed the glandular tissue through dissection of cadavers, proposing that this structure could constitute a previously unrecognized major salivary gland. Their findings raised clinical interest, particularly in radiation oncology, as damage to these glands during radiotherapy for head and neck cancers might contribute to xerostomia (dry mouth), even when the known major salivary glands are spared.

=== Minor salivary glands ===
Around 800 to 1,000 minor salivary glands are located throughout the oral cavity within the submucosa of the oral mucosa in the tissue of the buccal, labial, and lingual mucosa, the soft palate, the lateral parts of the hard palate, and the floor of the mouth or between muscle fibers of the tongue. They are 1 to 2 mm in diameter and unlike the major glands, they are not encapsulated by connective tissue, only surrounded by it. The gland has usually a number of acini connected in a tiny lobule. A minor salivary gland may have a common excretory duct with another gland, or may have its own excretory duct. Their secretion is mainly mucous in nature and have many functions such as coating the oral cavity with saliva. Problems with dentures are sometimes associated with minor salivary glands if dry mouth is present. The minor salivary glands are innervated by the facial nerve (cranial nerve CN VII).

=== Von Ebner's glands ===
Von Ebner's glands are found in a trough circling the circumvallate papillae on the dorsal surface of the tongue near the terminal sulcus. They secrete a purely serous fluid, and also facilitate the perception of taste through secretion of digestive enzymes and proteins. The arrangement of these glands around the circumvallate papillae provides a continuous flow of fluid over the great number of taste buds lining the sides of the papillae, and is important for dissolving the food particles to be tasted.

=== Nerve supply ===
Salivary glands are innervated, either directly or indirectly, by the parasympathetic and sympathetic arms of the autonomic nervous system. Parasympathetic stimulation evokes a copious flow of saliva.

- Parasympathetic innervation to the salivary glands is carried via cranial nerves. The parotid gland receives its parasympathetic input from the glossopharyngeal nerve (CN IX) via the otic ganglion, while the submandibular and sublingual glands receive their parasympathetic input from the facial nerve (CN VII) via the submandibular ganglion. These nerves release acetylcholine and substance P, which activate the IP3 and DAG pathways respectively.
- Direct sympathetic innervation of the salivary glands takes place via preganglionic nerves in the thoracic segments T1-T3 which synapse in the superior cervical ganglion with postganglionic neurons that release norepinephrine, which is then received by β_{1}-adrenergic receptors on the acinar and ductal cells of the salivary glands, leading to an increase in cyclic adenosine monophosphate (cAMP) levels and the corresponding increase of saliva secretion. Note that in this regard both parasympathetic and sympathetic stimuli result in an increase in salivary gland secretions, the difference lies on the composition of this saliva, once sympathetic stimulus results particularly in the increase of amylase secretion, which is produced by serous glands. The sympathetic nervous system also affects salivary gland secretions indirectly by innervating the blood vessels that supply the glands, resulting in vasoconstriction through the activation of α_{1} adrenergic receptors, lessening the saliva's water content.

=== Microanatomy ===
The gland is internally divided into lobules. Blood vessels and nerves enter the glands at the hilum and gradually branch out into the lobules.

==== Acini ====
Secretory cells are found in a group, or acinus. Each acinus is located at the terminal part of the gland connected to the ductal system, with many acini within each lobule of the gland. Each acinus consists of a single layer of cuboidal epithelial cells surrounding a lumen, a central opening where the saliva is deposited after being produced by the secretory cells. The three forms of acini are classified in terms of the type of epithelial cell present and the secretory product being produced - serous, mucoserous, and mucous.

==== Ducts ====
In the duct system, the lumina are formed by intercalated ducts, which in turn join to form striated ducts. These drain into ducts situated between the lobes of the gland (called interlobular ducts or secretory ducts). These are found on most major and minor glands (exception may be the sublingual gland).

All of the human salivary glands terminate in the mouth, where the saliva proceeds to aid in digestion. The released saliva is quickly inactivated in the stomach by the acid that is present, but saliva also contains enzymes that are actually activated by stomach acid.

=== Gene and protein expression ===
About 20,000 protein-coding genes are expressed in human cells and 60% of these genes are expressed in normal, adult salivary glands. Less than 100 genes are more specifically expressed in the salivary gland. The salivary gland specific genes are mainly genes that encode for secreted proteins and compared to other organs in the human body; the salivary gland has the highest fraction of secreted genes. The heterogeneous family of proline-rich, human salivary glycoproteins, such as PRB1 and PRH1, are salivary gland-specific proteins with highest level of expression. Examples of other specifically expressed proteins include the digestive amylase enzyme AMY1A, the mucin MUC7 and statherin, all of major importance for specific characteristics of saliva.

=== Aging ===
Aging of salivary glands shows some structural changes, such as:

- Decrease in volume of acinar tissue
- Increase in fibrous tissue
- Increase in adipose tissue
- Ductal hyperplasia and dilation

In addition, changes occur in salivary contents:

- Decrease in concentration of secretory IgE
- Decrease in the amount of mucin

However, no overall change in the amount of saliva secreted is seen.

== Function ==
Salivary glands secrete saliva, which has many benefits for the oral cavity and health in general. The knowledge of normal salivary flow rate (SFR) is extremely important when treating dental patients. These benefits include:

- Protection: Saliva consists of proteins (for example; mucins) that lubricate and protect both the soft and hard tissues of the oral cavity. Mucins are the principal organic constituents of mucus, the slimy viscoelastic material that coats all mucosal surfaces.
- Buffering: In general, the higher the saliva flow rate, the faster the clearance and the higher the buffer capacity, hence better protection from dental caries. Therefore, people with a slower rate of saliva secretion, combined with a low buffer capacity, have lessened salivary protection against microbes.
- Pellicle formation: Saliva forms a pellicle on the surface of the tooth to prevent wearing. The film contains mucins and proline-rich glycoprotein from the saliva.

The proteins (statherin and proline-rich proteins) within the salivary pellicle inhibit demineralization and promote remineralization by attracting calcium ions.

- Maintenance of tooth integrity: Demineralization occurs when enamel disintegrates due to the presence of acid. When this occurs, the buffering capacity effect of saliva (increases saliva flow rate) inhibits demineralization. Saliva can then begin to promote the remineralization of the tooth by strengthening the enamel with calcium and phosphate minerals.
- Antimicrobial action: Saliva can prevent microbial growth based on the elements it contains. For example, lactoferrin in saliva binds naturally with iron. Since iron is a major component of bacterial cell walls, removal of iron breaks down the cell wall, which in turn breaks down the bacterium. Antimicrobial peptides such as histatins inhibit the growth of Candida albicans and Streptococcus mutans. Salivary immunoglobulin A serves to aggregate oral bacteria such as S. mutans and prevent the formation of dental plaque.
- Tissue repair: Saliva can encourage soft-tissue repair by decreasing clotting time and increasing wound contraction.
- Digestion: Saliva contains amylase, which hydrolyses starch into glucose, maltose, and dextrin. As a result, saliva allows some digestion to occur before the food reaches the stomach.
- Taste: Saliva acts as a solvent in which solid particles can dissolve and enter the taste buds through oral mucosa located on the tongue. These taste buds are found within foliate and circumvallate papillae, where minor salivary glands secrete saliva.

== Clinical significance ==
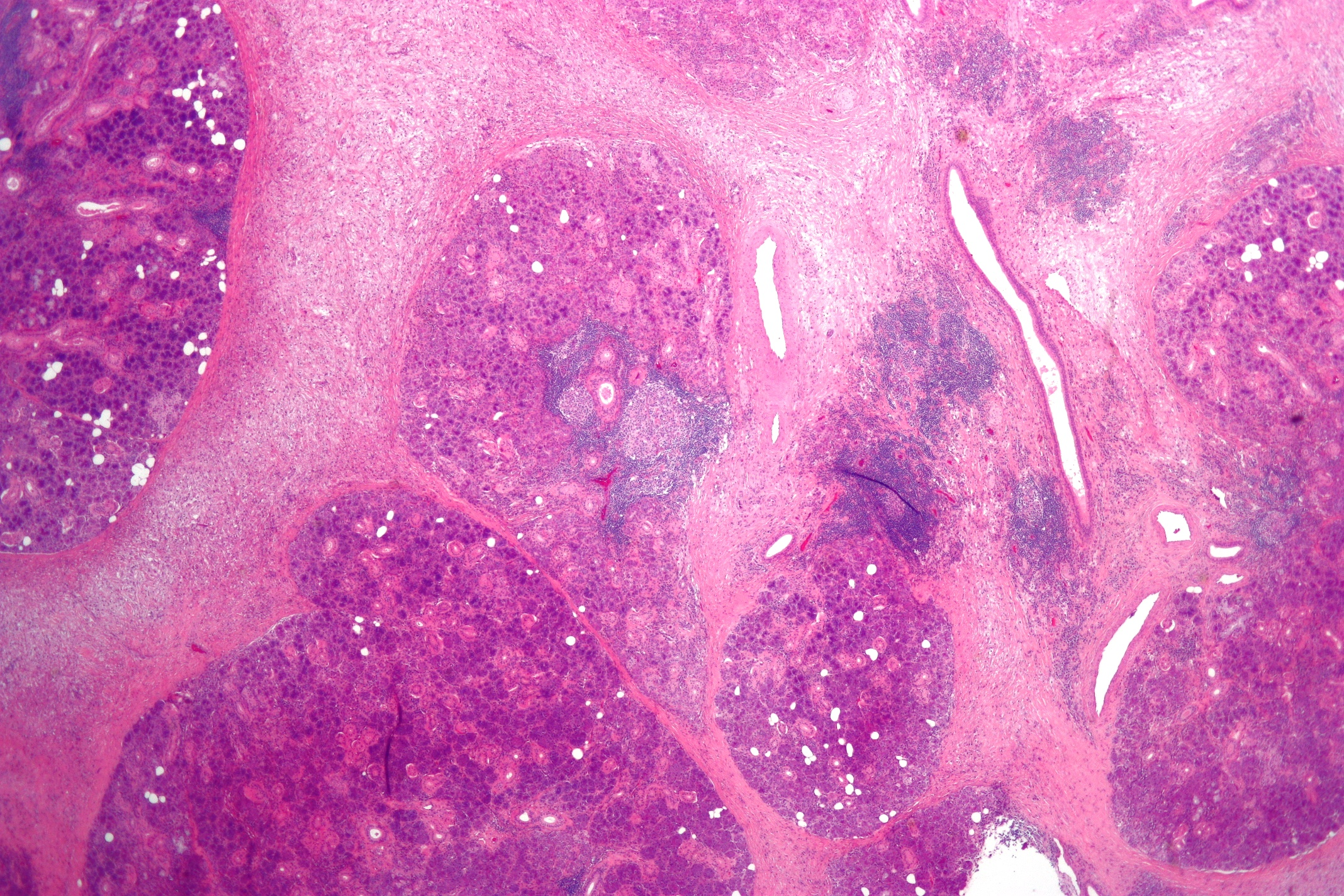
Micrograph of chronic inflammation of the salivary gland sialadenitis)

A sialolithiasis is a salivary stone that may cause blockage of the ducts, most commonly the submandibular ducts, causing pain and swelling of the gland.

Salivary gland dysfunction is either a reduced (hyposalivation), or an increased (hypersalivation) production of saliva. Xerostomia, the symptom of dry mouth is often caused by hyposalivation and is associated with significant impairment of quality of life. Following radiotherapy of the head and neck region, salivary gland dysfunction is a predictable side-effect. Saliva production may be pharmacologically stimulated by sialagogues such as pilocarpine and cevimeline. It can also be suppressed by so-called antisialagogues such as tricyclic antidepressants, SSRIs, antihypertensives, and polypharmacy. A Cochrane review found there was no strong evidence that topical therapies are effective in relieving the symptoms of dry mouth.

Cancer treatments including chemotherapy and radiation therapy may impair salivary flow. Radiotherapy can cause permanent hyposalivation due to injury to the oral mucosa containing the salivary glands, resulting in xerostomia, whereas chemotherapy may cause only temporary salivary impairment. Surgical removal of benign or malignant lesions may also impair function.

Graft-versus-host disease after allogeneic bone marrow transplantation may manifest as dry mouth and many small mucoceles. Salivary gland tumours may occur, including mucoepidermoid carcinoma, a malignant growth.

=== Imaging ===
A sialogram is a radiocontrast study of a salivary duct that may be used to check its function, and for diagnosing Sjögren syndrome. An ultrasound can also be done to diagnose Sjögren syndrome.

== Other animals ==
The salivary glands of some species are modified to produce proteins; salivary amylase is found in many bird and mammal species (including humans, as noted above). Furthermore, the venom glands of venomous snakes, Gila monsters, and some shrews, are actually modified salivary glands. In other organisms such as insects, salivary glands are often used to produce biologically important proteins such as silk or glues, whilst fly salivary glands contain polytene chromosomes that have been useful in genetic research.

== See also ==
- Serous demilune
- Sialome
