= Proline-rich protein 30 =

PRR30

Identifiers
- Aliases: PRR30, C2orf53, proline rich 30
- External IDs: MGI: 1923877; HomoloGene: 130773; GeneCards: PRR30; OMA:PRR30 - orthologs

Gene location (Human)
Chr.	Chromosome 2 (human)
Band	2p23.3	Start	27,136,848 bp
Band	2p23.3	End	27,139,410 bp

Gene location (Mouse)
Chr.	Chromosome 14 (mouse)
Band	14|14 E2.3	Start	101,435,126 bp
Band	14|14 E2.3	End	101,437,766 bp
RNA expression pattern
Bgee	Human / Mouse (ortholog); Top expressed in: left testis; right testis; sperm; testicle; lactiferous gland; amniotic fluid; blood; human musculoskeletal system; muscular system; muscle / Top expressed in: seminiferous tubule; spermatid; spermatocyte; dentate gyrus of hippocampal formation granule cell; medial geniculate nucleus; islet of Langerhans; liver; embryo; developmental structure; embryonic structure; More reference expression data
BioGPS	n/a
Orthologs
Species	Human	Mouse
Entrez	339779	76627
Ensembl	ENSG00000186143	ENSMUSG00000042888
UniProt	Q53SZ7	Q9D9B7
RefSeq (mRNA)	NM_178553	NM_029680
RefSeq (protein)	NP_848648	NP_083956
Location (UCSC)	Chr 2: 27.14 – 27.14 Mb	Chr 14: 101.44 – 101.44 Mb
PubMed search
- Wikidata
View/Edit Human	View/Edit Mouse

Proline-rich protein 30 (PRR30 or C2orf53) is a protein in humans that is encoded for by the PRR30 gene. PRR30 is a member in the family of Proline-rich proteins characterized by their intrinsic lack of structure. Copy number variations in the PRR30 gene have been associated with an increased risk for neurofibromatosis.

== Gene ==
The PRR30 gene is located on the short arm of human chromosome 2 at band 2p23.3. It flanked by Prolactin regulatory element binding (PREB) and Transcription Factor 23 (TCF23). The gene has three Exons in total. PRR30 has a length of 2618 base pairs of linear DNA.

PRR30 Gene Neighborhood

=== Promoter Region ===
The PRR30 promoter directly flanks the gene and is 1162 base pairs in length.

== Transcript ==
The PRR30 mRNA transcript is 2063 base pairs in length. There are four splice sites total all of which are in the 5’ UTR. There are no known isoforms or alternative splicing of PRR30.

PRR30 Splice Pattern

== Protein ==
Human protein PRR30 consists of 412 amino acid residues. It has a molecular weight of 44.7 kDa and an isoelectric point of 10.7. It is proline rich and composed primarily of non-essential amino acids. There is a region of extreme conservation across orthologs spanning from residues 187 to 321. PRR30 appears to be subcellularly localized to the cell nucleus. NetNES predicts a nuclear export signal from residues 213 to 216. IntAct predicts that PRR30 interacts with Human Testis Protein 37 or TEX37, Cystiene Rich Tail Protein 1 (CYSRT1), and Keratin Associated Protein 6-2 (KRTAP6-2). PRR30 is predicted to undergo post-translational modifications in the form of glycosylation and phosphorylation.

Adapted Prosite figure showing domains, phosphorylation sites (red), glycosylation sites (grey), and nuclear export signal (green).

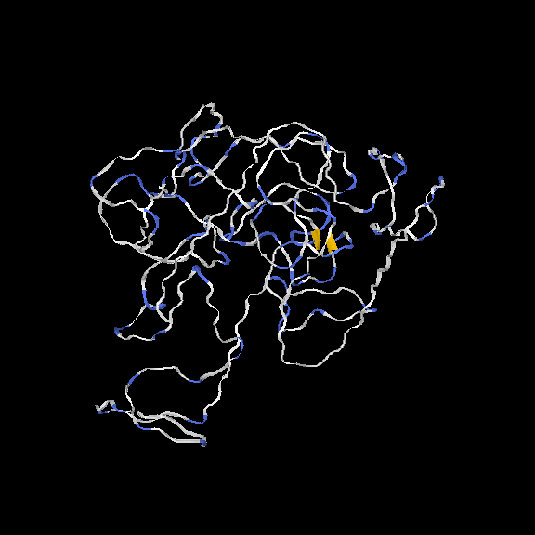
I-Tasser predicted protein PRR30. Largely unstructured with minimal folding in highly conserved region.

=== Structure ===
PRR30 is an intrinsically disordered protein (IDP) and lacks any formal tertiary structure or quaternary structure. I-Tasser and Phyre predict minimal coiling throughout PRR30 as a whole. In the region of high conservation, there are predicted alpha helices & beta sheets.

=== Function ===
Unstructured proteins like PRR30 are highly variable in function. Other Proline-Rich Proteins have been shown to have an affinity for binding calcium across different tissues in the human body. COACH predicts several ligand binding domains associated with calcium across PRR30. The highest confidence predicted calcium binding domain resides in the area of greatest conservation.

=== Expression ===
NCBI EST profiles have shown differential expression across many tissues but increased levels in the human testes and pharynx.

== Homology ==
PRR30 is exclusive to mammals but is not present in all mammals. PRR30 is highly conserved across Primates but shows loss of the gene in members of Rodents and Laurasiatheria. The most distant known ortholog of PRR30 is found in S. harrisii, Tasmanian Devil. The PRR30 gene appears to be evolving relatively fast rate.

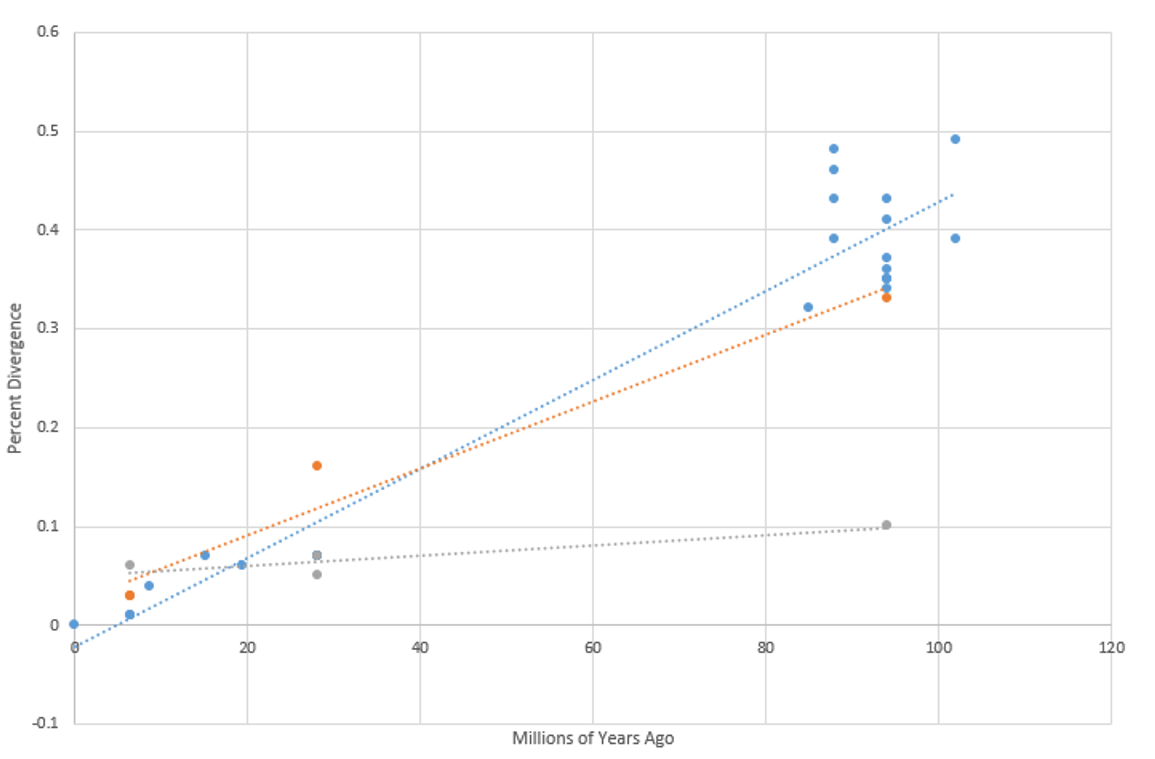
Comparison of evolutionary histories between Cytochrome C (grey), Fibrinogen (orange), and PRR30 (blue).

=== Paralogs ===
There are no known paralogs for PRR30.

=== Orthologs ===
Genus & Species	Sequence Identity	Date of Divergence (MYA)	Sequence Length
Homo sapiens/Human	100%	0	412
Pan paniscus	99%	6.4	412
Pan troglodytes/Chimpanzee	99%	6.4	412
Pongo pygmaeus/Bornean orangutan	93%	15.2	413
Nomascus leucogenys	94%	19.43	412
Gorilla gorilla/Western gorilla	96%	8.61	412
Macaca fascicularis	93%	28.1	412
Papio anubis	93%	28.1	412
Macaca nemestrina	93%	28.1	412
Acinonyx jubatus	66%	94	394
Bos taurus	65%	94	396
Bos indicus	65%	94	396
Heterocephalus glaber	57%	88	373
Cavia porcellus	54%	88	391
Octodon degus	61%	88	402
Mus musculus	52%	88	399
Echinops telfairi	61%	102	313
Erinaceus europaeus	57%	94	375
Tupaia chinensis	68%	85	410
Sorex araneus	59%	94	298
Elephantulus edwardii	51%	102	286
Rhinolophus sinicus	68%	94	359
Miniopterus natalensis	63%	94	396
Myotis brandtii	64%	94	239
Sarcophilus harrisii	57%	160	376

- This list is not comprehensive

== Clinical significance ==
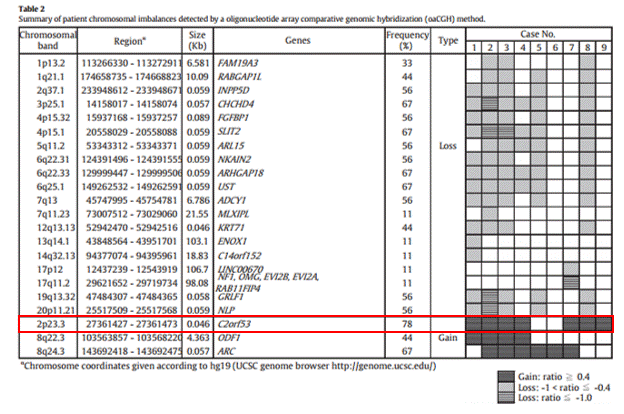
From a study on Neurofibromatosis, this graph shows that patients afflicted with Neurofibromatosis Type 1 are likely to have an extra copy of C2orf53.

In recent 2015 study, copy number variation of PRR30 gene was linked to an increase risk for neurofibromatosis. 78% of the patients displaying type 1-associated cutaneous neurofibromas carried an extra copy of the PRR30 gene. No mechanism was described illuminating the correlation.
