= Katherine Franz =

American chemist (born 1972)

- Born: Katherine J. Franz; 1972 (age 53–54)
- Education: Wellesley College; Massachusetts Institute of Technology
- Scientific career
- Institutions: Duke University
- Thesis: Nitric oxide reactivity of manganese, iron and cobalt tropocoronands and development of fluorescent aminotroponiminates for nitric oxide sensing (2000)

Katherine J. Franz (born 1972) is an American chemist. She is the chair of the department of chemistry at Duke University. She studies metal ion coordination in biological systems and looks to use the insight to manage species such as copper and iron. Franz was awarded the American Chemical Society Award for Encouraging Women into Careers in the Chemical Sciences.

== Early life and education ==
Born 1972, Franz studied at Wellesley College and earned her bachelor's degree in 1995. She was a member of the Wellesley College cross country team. She moved to Massachusetts Institute of Technology for her graduate studies, where she worked under the supervision of Stephen J. Lippard and completed her PhD in 2001. Her research considered the nitric oxide reactivity of manganese, iron and cobalt tropocoronand ligands. She was an National Institutes of Health postdoctoral fellow from 2000 to 2003.

== Research and career ==
Franz became an assistant professor at Duke University in 2003. She is an Associate member of the Duke Cancer Institute. In 2005, Franz was awarded an National Science Foundation CAREER Award. She was made a Sloan Research Fellow in 2008 and promoted to professor in 2015.

Franz has investigated the use of cellular metals in antimicrobial resistance. For example, by disrupting the amount of iron in a cell it is possible to withhold an essential pathogen, limiting the growth of microbes. On the other hand, copper can be used to control the growth of microbes, and immune cells appear to move copper to kill pathogens. At the same time, pathogens try to use copper to enhance their resistance and likelihood of survival. Franz attempts to use copper in the same way as biological systems to target antimicrobial agents. She has looked at iron and copper as ionophores; which are important in the virulence of Cryptococcus neoformans.

Franz also works on anti-cancer prochelators; molecules that do not have much affinity for metal ions, but can be triggered until they undergo a chemical conversion. Cancer cells have different metallomes than normal cells. For example, prostate cancer results in the overexpression of copper trafficking proteins, causing a high level of copper. She looks to target these copper ions by creating prochelators that become activated in the microenvironment of cancer. Gamma-glutamyltransferase is an enzyme that is overexpressed in cancer, and releases the chelator dithiocarbamate from the prochelator developed by Franz's research group, which forms a toxic copper complex. She works on iron chelators that can be used to remove deleterious iron in brain regions impacted by Parkinson's disease without damaging the healthy metal ions. The chelators developed by Franz have no affinity for iron until a mask is released by hydrogen peroxide, releasing a reactive oxygen species that combines with iron to form hydroxyl radicals. Additionally Franz studies copper-binding peptides such as histatin. Histatin binds to copper in vitro, but it is not clear how they interact or how the anti-fungal activity is modified. The Franz group have studied the anti-fungal activity of Histatin-5 against Candida albicans.

=== Academic service ===
Alongside her academic research, Franz is committed to mentoring early career researchers. She was awarded the Duke University Dean's Award for Excellence in Mentoring in 2016. In 2019 Franz was awarded the American Chemical Society Award for Encouraging Women into Careers in the Chemical Sciences.

Franz co-edited the American Chemical Society Metals in Medicine Chemical Reviews. Franz was made the chair of the Gordon Research Conference on Metals in Medicine in 2013.

=== Selected publications ===
Her publications include;

- Franz, Katherine J. (2003). "Protein Alignment by a Coexpressed Lanthanide-Binding Tag for the Measurement of Residual Dipolar Couplings". Journal of the American Chemical Society. 125 (44): 13338–13339. Bibcode:2003JAChS.12513338W. doi:10.1021/ja036022d. PMID 14583012.
- Franz, Katherine J. (2009). "Application of Metal Coordination Chemistry To Explore and Manipulate Cell Biology". Chemical Reviews. 109 (10): 4921–4960. doi:10.1021/cr900134a. PMC 2761982. PMID 19715312.
- Franz, Katherine J. (2012). "Coordination chemistry of copper proteins: How nature handles a toxic cargo for essential function". Journal of Inorganic Biochemistry. 107 (1): 129–143. doi:10.1016/j.jinorgbio.2011.11.024. PMID 22204943.
