= FDC-SP =

Protein

FDCSP

Identifiers
- Aliases: FDCSP, C4orf7, FDC-SP, follicular dendritic cell secreted protein
- External IDs: OMIM: 607241; GeneCards: FDCSP

Gene location (Human)
Chr.	Chromosome 4 (human)
Band	4q13.3|4q13	Start	70,226,124 bp
Band	4q13.3|4q13	End	70,235,252 bp
RNA expression pattern
Bgee	Human / Mouse (ortholog); Top expressed in: olfactory zone of nasal mucosa; appendix; tonsil; lymph node; mucosa of ileum; salivary gland; minor salivary glands; parotid gland; trachea; superficial temporal artery / n/a; More reference expression data
BioGPS	n/a
Orthologs
Databases	NCBI: entry; OMA: entry
Species	Human	Mouse
Entrez	260436	n/a
Ensembl	ENSG00000181617	n/a
UniProt	Q8NFU4	n/a
RefSeq (mRNA)	NM_152997	n/a
RefSeq (protein)	NP_694542	n/a
Location (UCSC)	Chr 4: 70.23 – 70.24 Mb	n/a
PubMed search		n/a
- Wikidata
View/Edit Human

FDC-SP or follicular dendritic cell-secreted protein, is a small, secreted protein, located on chromosome 4 in humans. It is thought to play an immune role in the junctional epithelium at the gingival crevice in the human mouth. It is very similar in structure to statherin, a protein contained in saliva.

== Structure and genetics ==
FDC-SP is a 68-amino acid protein containing a signal peptide at its N terminus, which is used for directing the transport of the protein. Adjacent to the signal peptide, the protein contains a highly charged N-terminal sequence. The C-terminal half of FDC-SP is proline-rich and not highly conserved between species, but the alignment of proline residues within this region is highly conserved. FDC-SP homologues are only easily located within the human, rat, mouse and chimpanzee genome. There is a 70% sequence homology between mouse and rat and a 45% homology between human and mouse. The N-terminal, however, is highly conserved between all three species and is thought to contain potential casein kinase 2 (CK2) phosphorylation sites. CK2 is a constitutively and widely expressed serine/threonine kinase that has many substrates related to signal transduction and cell growth regulation. Several casein genes have also been found nearby to the FDC-SP gene. Numerous genes that are expressed in oral tissues, including statherin, mucin, ameloblastin, histatin, enamelin and proline-rich protein are also located close to the FDC-SP gene. This indicates that the aforementioned genes may be expressed through the same mechanism. The recent evolutionary development of FDC-SP correlates with the development of certain aspects of the mammalian immune system and with the emergence of the follicular germinal centre (GC) reaction in secondary lymphoid tissues.

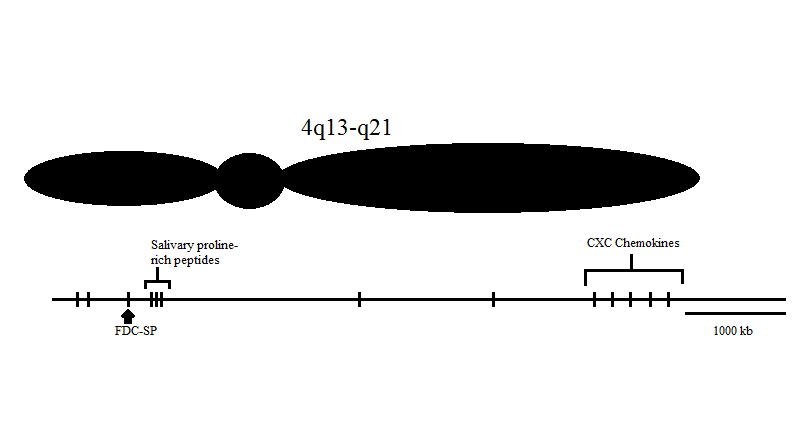
Chromosome 4

== Expression ==
In humans, FDC-SP was first found within follicular dendritic cell isolates from the tonsil, and later was found to be specifically expressed within the periodontal ligament. FDC-SP expression can be induced in human FDC-like cell lines by exposure to tumour necrosis factor (TNF). Exposure of human peripheral blood cells to LPS can also result in FDC-SP expression, but TNF exposure does not cause FDC-SP expression and similarly LPS exposure does not cause expression within FDC-like cell lines. Expression in mouse splenocytes can be induced by LPS in a similar manner to that of human peripheral blood cells.

In mice, as in humans, FDC-SP is not expressed in B cells, but FDC-SP expression in FDCs can be dependent on B cells after their stimulation by CD40. After stimulation with CD40, B cells have been shown to be able to induce phenotypic changes in FDCs through the B cell's surface TNF expression. It has therefore been suggested that the expression of TNF cytokines by B cells causes FDC-SP expression within FDCs upon contact. This reaction is said to be typical during GC formation.

FDC-SP is highly expressed in the junctional epithelium and well as in the tonsils, prostate, lymph nodes and trachea. The proline rich region in the C-terminal half bears some resemblance to the antimicrobial peptide Bac5. FDC-SP may therefore have a role in microbial defense in the oral cavity.

== Function ==
In transgenic mice engineered to constitutively express FDC-SP, the number and size of GCs formed after immunization with a T-dependent antigen significantly decreased. The position of these GCs is normal, but they do not form centres of highly-proliferating B cells, which us thought be due to FDC-SP affecting the development of GCs. The mechanism by which FDC-SP exerts its effects upon GC development is not currently known. The formation of FDC networks appears to be normal in transgenic mice, as does T cell response.

FDC-SP is an amphipathic molecule, similar to surfactant proteins A and D, which are thought to be involved in the innate immune system of the lung. These proteins allow for the phagocytosis of bacteria by binding to them. Stathrin has been proposed to have similar properties, which itself possesses similar properties to FDC-SP. Stathrin can bind oral bacteria, so it has been proposed that FDC-SP acts as part of a host defence mechanism against oral pathogens.

FDC-SP is thought to bind target cells through a specific receptor in a similar manner to cytokines and chemokines. Although it shares no sequence homology with chemokines or cytokines, FDC-SP has several properties in common with several inflammatory mediators, including molecular mass and amino acid composition. The FDC-SP gene is also located next to a group of proline-rich salivary peptide genes, which themselves are next several to CXC chemokine genes. FDC-SP has an effect on B cell migration when used in conjunction with L cells, and migration is significantly increased when the B cells are stimulated with anti-CD40 plus IL-4. The addition of anti-CD40 causes the B cells to resemble those found in the GC. Pertussis toxin inhibits the action of G proteins and B cells treated with the toxin were observed to migrate poorly in response to FDC-SP.

FDC-SP has been found to have an unusually high level of expression in a number of tumours, including breast carcinoma, epithelial ovarian carcinoma and endometrial carcinoma. It is hypothesised that FDC-SP can influence cell motility by specific receptor binding in a similar manner to chemokines. It is also thought that FDC-SP can regulate the assembly of the actin cytoskeleton, which may have an effect on cell motility.
