= IB5 =

IB5 may refer to:

- a model of Ford IB transmission
- protein IB5, a human salivary protein
