= Proline rich protein =

Class of proteins

Proline-rich proteins (PRPs) are a class of intrinsically disordered proteins (IDPs) containing several repeats of a short proline-rich sequence.

An example of this class of protein is PRB4 (IB5), a human parotid salivary protein known to bind with polyphenols (binding responsible for the astringency mouth feel).

== Tannin binding ==
Many tannin-consuming animals secrete a tannin-binding protein (mucin) in their saliva. Tannin-binding capacity of salivary mucin is directly related to its proline content. Advantages in using salivary proline-rich proteins (PRPs) to inactivate tannins are:

- PRPs inactivate tannins to a greater extent than do dietary proteins; this results in reduced fecal nitrogen losses,
- PRPs contain non specific nitrogen and nonessential amino acids; this makes them more convenient for an animal to exploit rather than using up valuable dietary protein.

== Example subgroups ==
- Salivary basic: PRB1, PRB2, PRB3, PRB4
- Salivary acidic: PRH1, PRH2
- Proline-rich with coiled coil: PRRC1, PRRC2A, PRRC2B, PRRC2C
- Proline-rich transmembrane: PRRT1, PRRT1L, PRRT2, PRRT3, PRRT4
- Other proline-rich: PRR3, PRR4, ..., PRR36

== See also ==
- Polyproline helix
- SH3 domain
