= Histatin =

Group of antimicrobial porins in saliva

Histatins are a family of histidine-rich (cationic) antimicrobial proteins found in saliva. Histatin's involvement in antimicrobial activities makes histatin part of the innate immune system. Histatin was first discovered (isolated) in 1988, with functions that are responsible in keeping homeostasis inside the oral cavity, helping in the formation of pellicles, and assist in bonding of metal ions. Histatin has multiple structures, dependent on the specific protein of interest.

== Structure ==
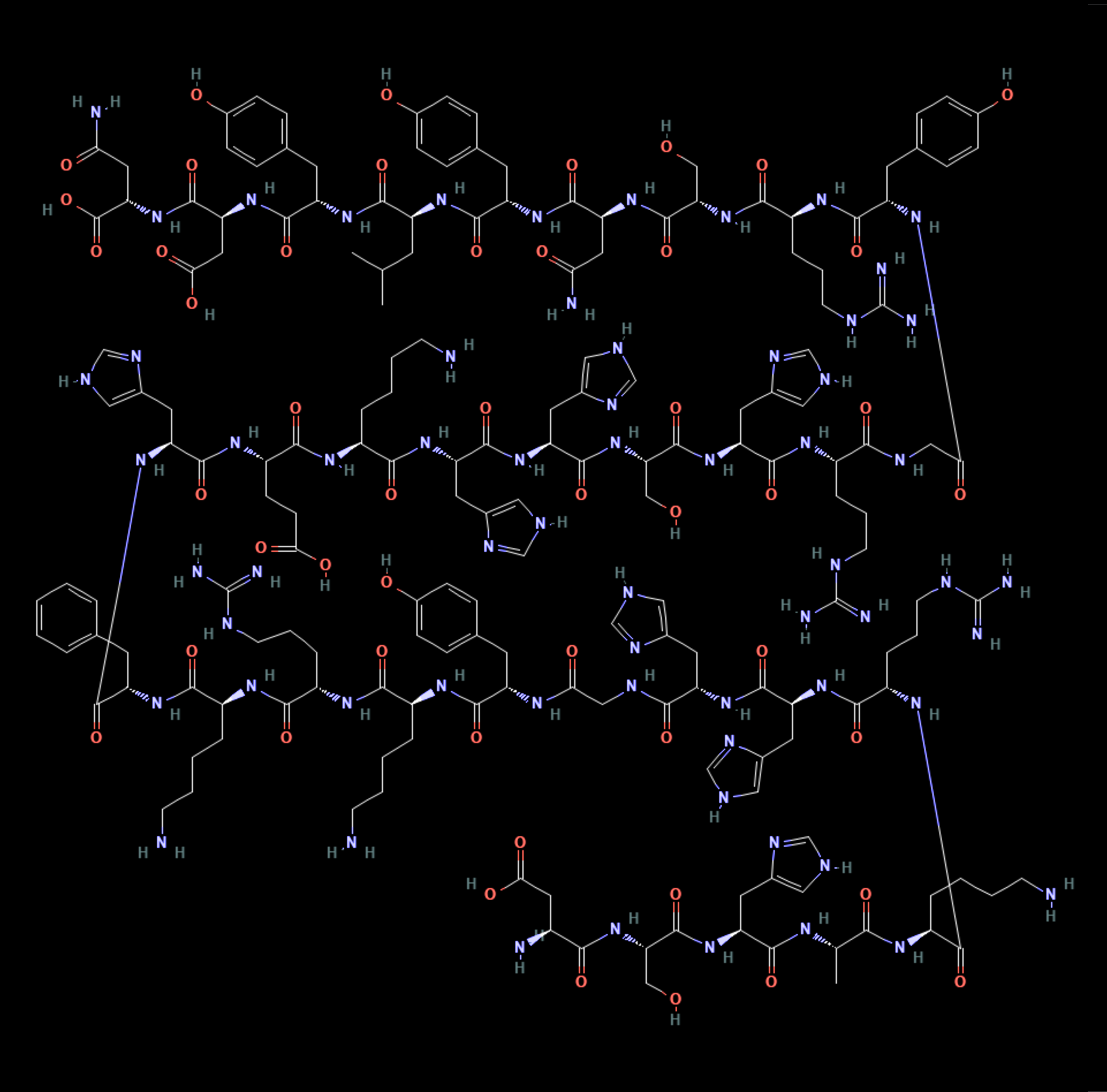
Structure of Histatin-3

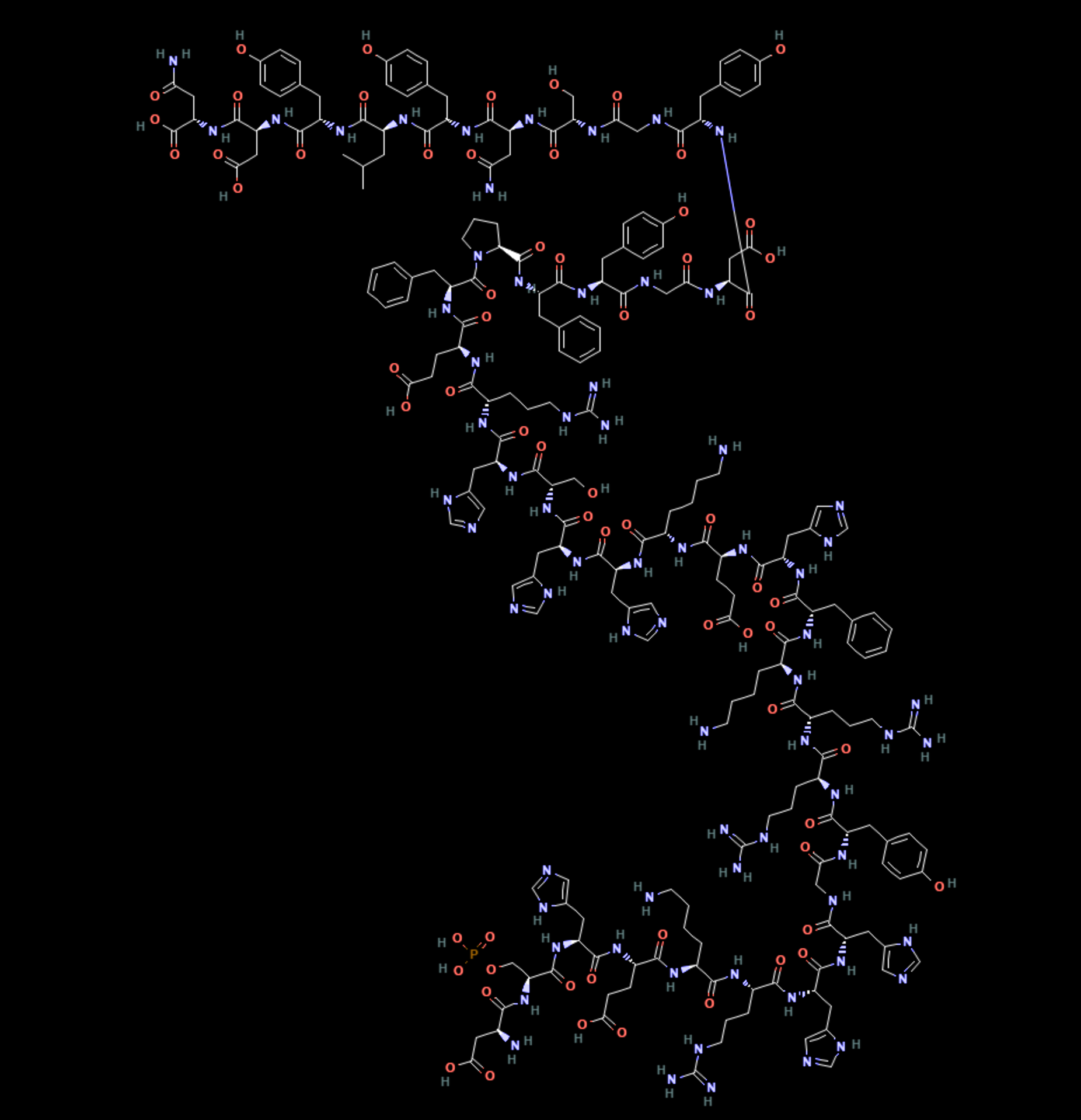
Structure of HTN1 Human, Histatin 1

The structure of histatin is unique depending on whether the protein of interest is histatin 1, 3 or 5. Nonetheless, histatins mainly possess a cationic (positive) charge due to the primary structure consisting mostly of basic amino acids. An amino acid that is crucial to histatin's function is histidine. Studies show that the removal of histidine (especially in histatin 5) resulted in reduction of antifungal activity.

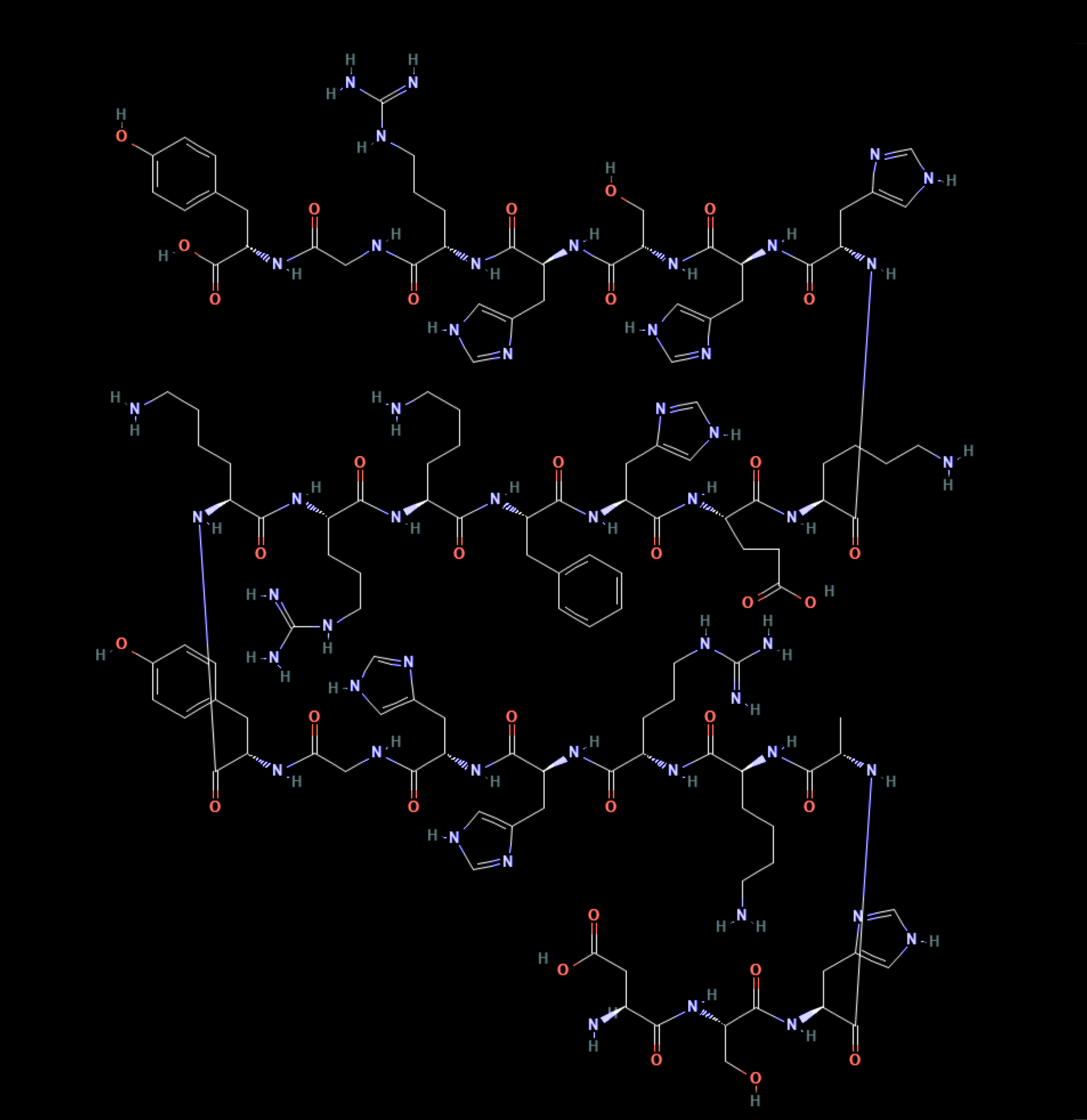
Structure of Histatin-5

Histatins are encoded by two genes, HTN1 and HTN3. The primary members include histatin 1 (38 amino acids), histatin 3 (32 amino acids), and histatin 5 (24 amino acids), with histatin 5 derived from proteolytic cleavage of histatin 3. Histatin 1 (UniProt ID: P15515) is notable for its phosphorylation at serine residues, which enhances its binding to hydroxyapatite in the acquired enamel pellicle.

== Function ==
Histatins are antimicrobial and antifungal proteins, and have been found to play a role in wound-closure. A significant source of histatins is found in the serous fluid secreted by Ebner's glands, salivary glands at the back of the tongue, and produced by acinus cells. Here they offer some early defense against incoming microbes.

The three major histatins are 1, 3, and 5, which contains 38, 32, and 24 amino acids, respectively. Histatin 2 is a degradation product of histatin 1, and all other histatins are degradation products of Histatin 3 through the process of post-translational proteolysis of the HTN3 gene product. Therefore there are only two genes, HTN1 and HTN3.

The N-terminus of histatin 5 allows it to bind with metals, and this can result in the production of reactive oxygen species.

Histatins disrupt the fungal plasma membrane, resulting in release of the intracellular content of the fungal cell. They also inhibit the growth of yeast, by binding to the potassium transporter and facilitating in the loss of azole-resistant species.

The antifungal properties of histatins have been seen with fungi such as Candida glabrata, Candida krusei, Saccharomyces cerevisiae, and Cryptococcus neoformans.

Histatins also precipitate tannins from solution, thus preventing alimentary adsorption. Histatins are a family of small, histidine-rich, cationic peptides found in human saliva. They are part of the innate immune system and play critical roles in oral health, including antifungal activity, wound healing, and cell migration.

== Histatin 5 ==
Histatin 5 is the protein that is associated with the most antifungal function. The antimicrobial activity is concentrated in a region known as the functional domain. An example of its antimicrobial activity is its mechanism of action against C. albicans. The peptide is consumed by the cell and it causes ATP efflux and the production of reactive oxygen species.

=== Antifungal activity ===
Histatin 5 exerts potent antifungal effects against Candida albicans by disrupting mitochondrial respiration and generating reactive oxygen species (ROS), leading to fungal cell death. This mechanism is distinct from pore-forming peptides and requires active fungal metabolism.

As mentioned, histatins are able to boost oral health. This is due to its ability to inhibit adsorption of high-molecular-weight glycoproteins, which serve as sources for cariogenic bacteria. Moreover, histatins help maintain high calcium and phosphate ionic levels which boosts enamel integrity. Enamel integrity is based upon its ability to remineralize, which requires the precipitation of calcium phosphate.

=== Wound healing ===
Histatins 1 and 2 are major contributors to oral wound closure. They promote epithelial cell migration via stereospecific activation of the ERK1/2 signaling pathway, enhancing re-epithelialization in vitro and in vivo. Histatin 1 also stimulates endothelial cell migration and angiogenesis, critical for tissue repair.

=== Cell migration ===
Histatins enhance migration in oral keratinocytes, fibroblasts, and endothelial cells. By increasing the number of fibroblast cells, histatin improves collagen deposition as well. Histatin 1 activates Rac1 GTPase through the RIN2/Rab5 signaling axis, facilitating cell adhesion and vascular morphogenesis.
