= Giannuzzi =

Giannuzzi is a surname. Notable people with the surname include:

- Giuseppe Oronzo Giannuzzi (1838–1876), Italian physiologist
- Joaquín Giannuzzi (1924–2004), Argentine writer
