= Serous demilune =

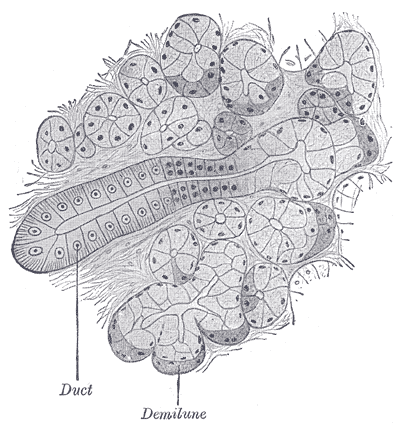
- Section of submandibular gland of kitten. Duct semidiagrammatic. (Demilune labeled at center bottom.)

Identifiers
- TH: H2.00.02.0.03062

Serous demilunes, also known as Crescents of Giannuzzi or Demilunes of Heidenhain, are cellular formations in the shape of a half-moon (hence the name "demilune") on the mixed submandibular and sublingual salivary glands.

Serous demilunes are the serous cells at the distal end of mucous acini, the secretory endpieces of certain salivary glands. These demilune cells secrete the proteins that contain the enzyme lysozyme, which degrades the cell walls of bacteria. In this way, lysozyme confers antimicrobial activity to mucus.

The serous demilune is an artifact from traditional methods of preparing samples. Samples are traditionally preserved and fixed in formaldehyde. When samples were preserved by quick-freezing in liquid nitrogen and then fixed with osmium tetraoxide in acetone, no demilunes were found. Examination showed that the serous cells and mucosal cells were aligned in the acinus. The traditional preparation caused mucous cells to swell during fixation which results in the serous cells being popped out of their alignment. After sectioning the serous cells resembled the common demilune shape, and were so named.

When the gland has this demilunar structure, it has mucoserous acini producing both serous and mucous secretions.

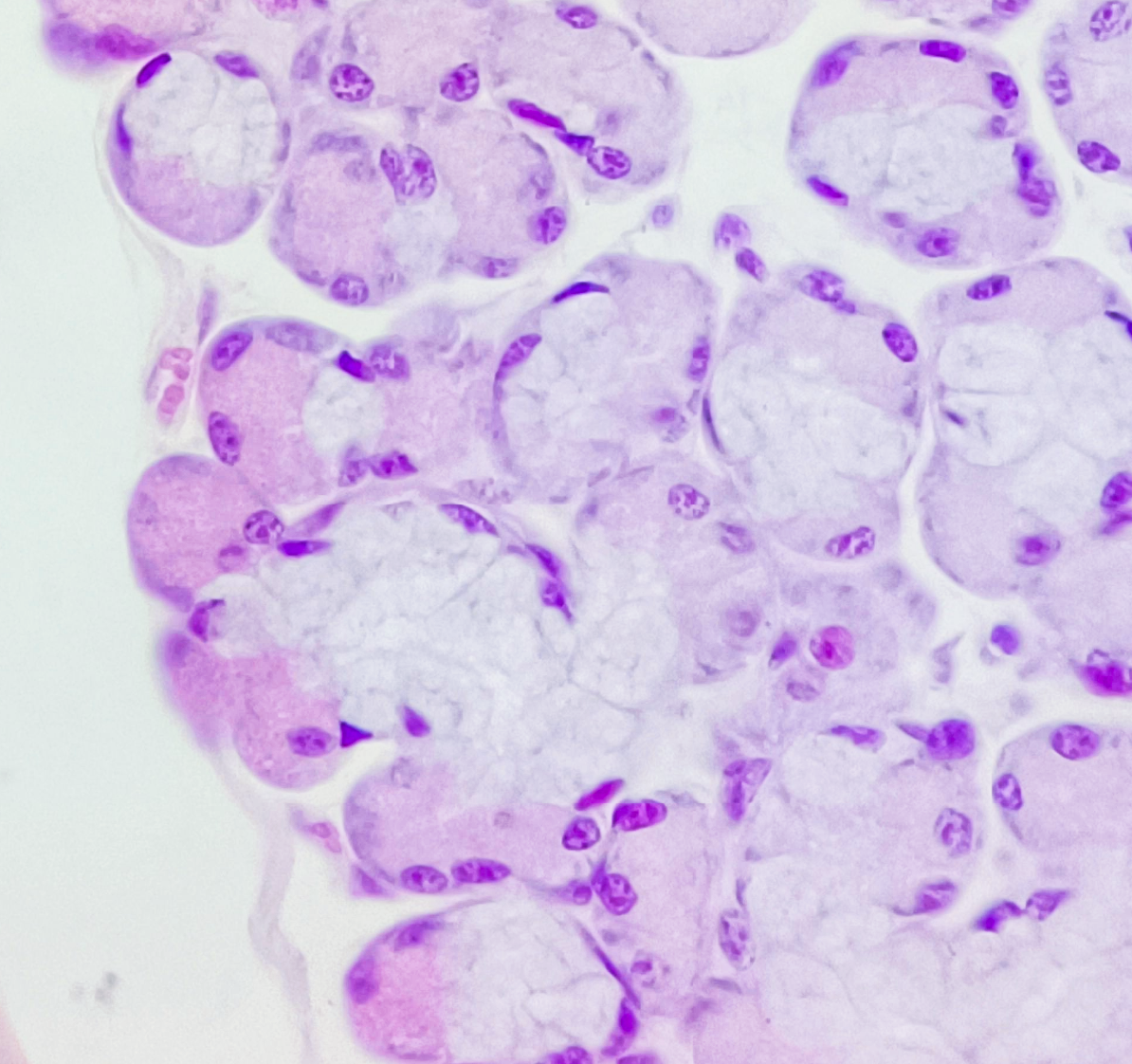
Slice of submandibular gland. H&E staining, the structure of the red stained cytoplasm on the left is the serous demilunes.

== See also ==
- Giuseppe Oronzo Giannuzzi
- Rudolf Heidenhain
