= Tubarial salivary gland =

Pair of salivary glands behind the nasal cavity

The tubarial salivary glands, also known as the tubarial glands, are a pair of salivary glands found in humans between the nasal cavity and throat.

== Description ==
The tubarial glands (TGs) are located in the nasopharynx. They are situated proximal to the eustachian tube, superior to the soft palate and posterior to the inferior nasal conchae. The tubarial glands overlay the torus tubarius region and are found on the dorsolateral or posterior lateral wall of the nasopharynx, extending from the skull base down on the inner side of the superior constrictor muscle.

The tubarial glands are difficult to visualize on standard radiological images like MRI, appearing as shadowy regions of soft tissue. However, they can be visualized clearly using prostate-specific membrane antigen (PSMA) positron emission tomography—computed tomography (PET/CT).

== History ==
The glands were discovered by a group of Dutch scientists at the Netherlands Cancer Institute in September 2020 using PET/CT scans in patients injected with PSMA-tracer.

== Significance ==
Tubarial glands are packed with predominantly mucinous acini and can release mucinous fluid that coats and moistens the mucosal surface of the pharynx. Due to their location at the posterior-superior aspect of the nasopharynx, they serve as a "spout" of glandular tissue that can effectively provide protective coverage to a large area of the pharynx. This protection may involve modulating environmental pH and immune interactions. Based on their size, density, and location, they are considered the predominant glandular tissue in the pharyngeal region capable of providing enough secretion for mucosal protection.

Dysfunction of the tubarial glands could be associated with dry mouth (xerostomia) and difficulty swallowing (dysphagia). The tubarial glands might also contribute as a source of SG tumors—it is believed that avoiding the irradiation of the glands can lessen some side effects of radiotherapy.

== Controversy ==
The claim that this organ was only recently discovered has been disputed by anatomists.
