= Sialome =

The word, sialome, is a junction of the Greek word for saliva (sialos) and the suffix used in molecular biology to reference a totality of some sort, -ome. The name relating to its role in biochemistry.

In biochemistry, the term sialome may refer to two distinct concepts:

- The set of mRNA and proteins expressed in the salivary glands, especially of mosquitoes, ticks, and other blood-sucking arthropods.
- The total complement of sialic acid types and linkages and their modes of presentation on a particular organelle, cell, tissue, organ or organism - as found at a particular time and under specific conditions.

Thus, the sialome can refer to the totality of the salivary gland mRNA and proteins expressed by an organism, at a particular time and under specific cellular conditions.

Sialome can also refer to the total complement of sialic acid derivative modifications found at the terminal ends of glycan chains that cover the surfaces of proteins, organelles, and cells. These modifications can be found in vertebrates and more complex invertebrates, and consists of the anionic nine-carbon monosaccharide structure of sialic acid with various structural additions to the hydroxyl groups of the molecule resulting in various derivatives with varying chemical properties. The modifications are responsible for conferring proteins, organelles, and cells with physical and electrostatic properties to facilitate specific functions, like facilitating protein folding, cell transport, or mediate non specific interactions with other macromolecules or cells.

Furthermore, the terminal saccharide in glycan chains can serve to function in specific ligand interactions with lectins(carbohydrate binding molecules), these lectins can originate from the host and can interact with the terminal saccharides of a glycan chain in a specific process or they can originate from pathogens and interact with terminal saccharides to aid in pathogen entry into cells.
