= Mucin 7 =

Protein-coding gene in the species Homo sapiens

MUC7

Identifiers
- Aliases: MUC7, MG2, mucin 7, secreted
- External IDs: OMIM: 158375; GeneCards: MUC7

Gene location (Human)
| Chr. | Chromosome 4 (human) |
| Band | 4q13.3 | Start | 70,430,492 bp |
| Band | 4q13.3 | End | 70,482,997 bp |
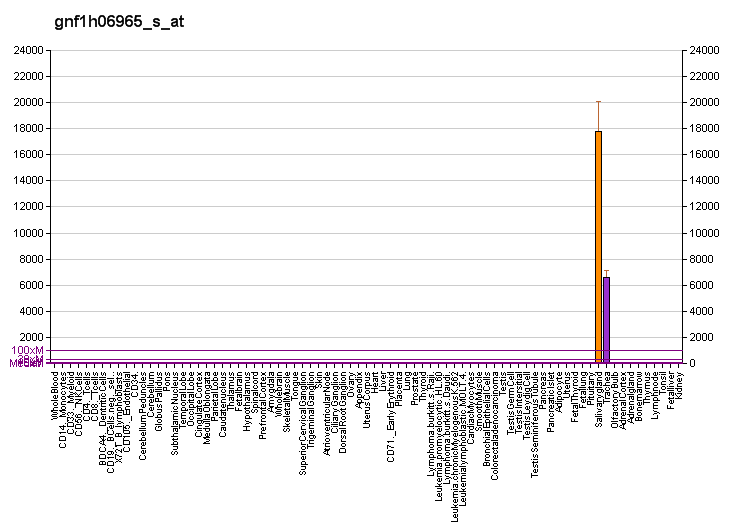

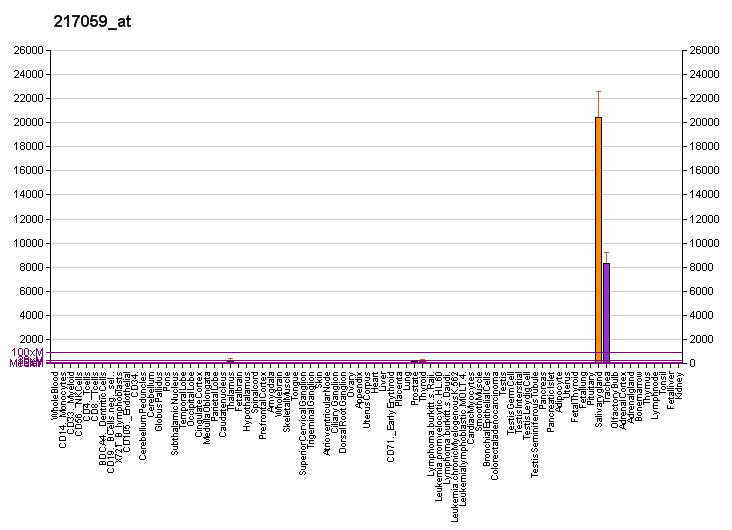
RNA expression pattern
| Bgee | Human / Mouse (ortholog); Top expressed in: trachea; parotid gland; minor salivary glands; olfactory zone of nasal mucosa; skin of thigh; testicle; palpebral conjunctiva; amniotic fluid; tongue; right lung / n/a; More reference expression data |
| BioGPS | More reference expression data |
Gene ontology
| Molecular function | protein binding |
| Cellular component | Golgi lumen; extracellular region; extracellular exosome; plasma membrane |
| Biological process | O-glycan processing; stimulatory C-type lectin receptor signaling pathway; antimicrobial humoral immune response mediated by antimicrobial peptide |
Sources:Amigo / QuickGO
Orthologs
| Databases | NCBI: entry; OMA: entry |
| Species | Human | Mouse |
| Entrez | 4589 | n/a |
| Ensembl | ENSG00000171195 | n/a |
| UniProt | Q8TAX7 | n/a |
| RefSeq (mRNA) | NM_152291; NM_001145006; NM_001145007 | n/a |
| RefSeq (protein) | NP_001138478; NP_001138479; NP_689504 | n/a |
| Location (UCSC) | Chr 4: 70.43 – 70.48 Mb | n/a |
| PubMed search | | n/a |
- Wikidata
| View/Edit Human |

Mucin-7 is a protein that in humans is encoded by the MUC7 gene. Mucin 7 is one of the main mucins secreted into saliva. Unlike mucin 5B, one of the other main salivary mucins, mucin 7 is non-gel forming. Relatedly, mucin 7 appears to be less efficient as a lubricant, but more efficient at clearing out bacteria, suggesting an important role in protection against microbes.

It is secreted by the submandibular and sublingual glands, along with most minor salivary glands (with the notable exception of the von Ebner's glands), and is secreted by both mucous and serous acinar cells (really seromucous cells) in these glands.

In animals, the MUC7 gene is found in most placental mammals, but not marsupials.

== Human variations ==
Mucins contain PTS domains with a large number of tandem repeats. Humans typically carry either a five or six PTS tandem repeat version of the gene. In other primates, the number of repeats found is 4-5 for gorillas, 5 for chimpanzees, 6-7 for orangutans, 8-10 for macaques, 10-11 for baboons and 11-12 for green monkeys.
