= Giuseppe Oronzo Giannuzzi =

Italian physiologist

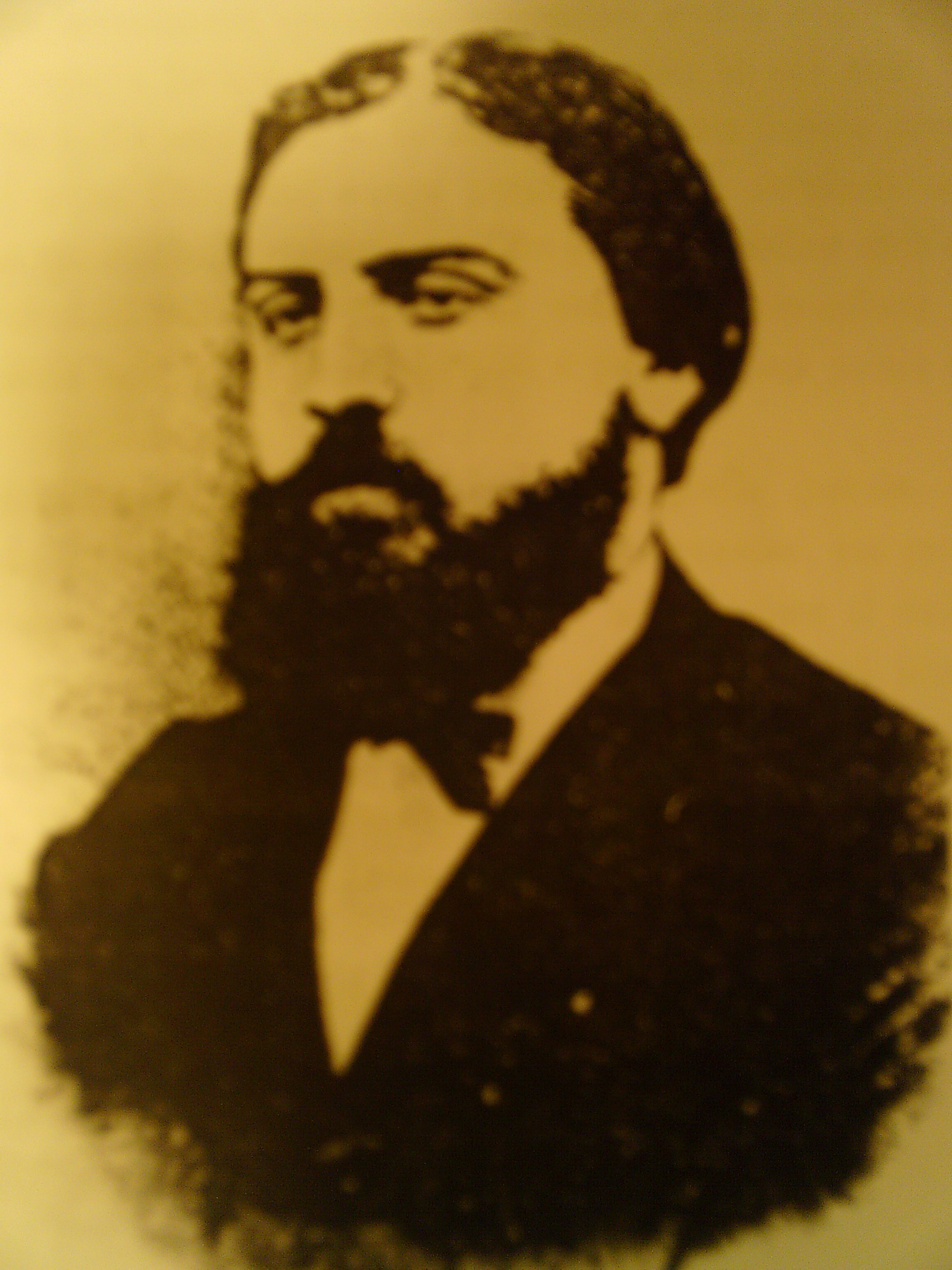
Giuseppe Oronzo Giannuzzi

Giuseppe Oronzo Giannuzzi (March 16, 1838, Altamura, Kingdom of the Two Sicilies – March 8, 1876, Siena, Italy) was an Italian physiologist.

== About ==
After graduating in medicine in Pisa in 1861, Giannuzzi studied at Claude Bernard's laboratory in Paris. In 1864 he moved to Berlin in the school of Rudolf Virchow under the leadership of Wilhelm Kühne. He was also at Carl Ludwig's laboratory in Leipzig. In 1867 he became professor of Physiology at the University of Siena where he carried out original research.

Giannuzzi's most important discovery was one of the serous demilunes, or crescents: cellular formations that are on some submaxillary salivary glands.

He founded the "Rivista Scientifica" and he was the director.
