= PRR4 =

Protein-coding gene in the species Homo sapiens

Identifiers
- Aliases: PRR4, LPRP, PROL4, proline rich 4 (lacrimal), proline rich 4
- External IDs: OMIM: 605359; HomoloGene: 48512; GeneCards: PRR4; OMA:PRR4 - orthologs

Gene location (Human)
Chr.	Chromosome 12 (human)
Band	12p13.2	Start	10,845,849 bp
Band	12p13.2	End	10,849,475 bp
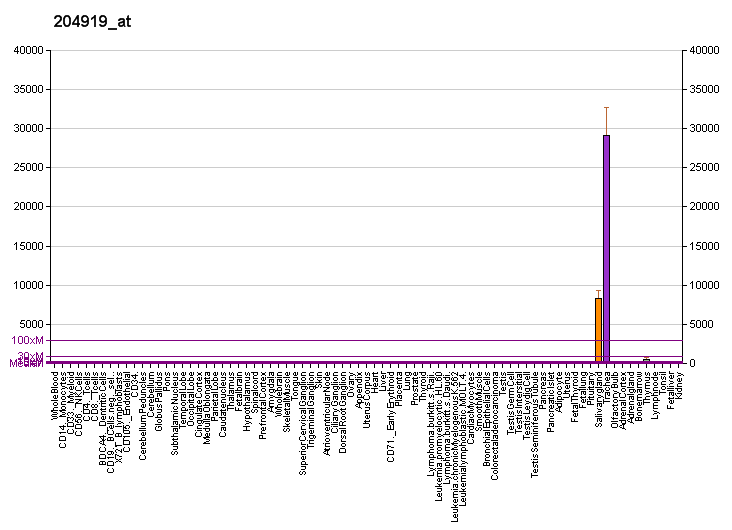
RNA expression pattern
Bgee	Human / Mouse (ortholog); Top expressed in: olfactory zone of nasal mucosa; salivary gland; minor salivary glands; testicle; skin of leg; duodenum; primary visual cortex; C1 segment; skin of abdomen; substantia nigra / n/a; More reference expression data
BioGPS	More reference expression data
Orthologs
Species	Human	Mouse
Entrez	11272	n/a
Ensembl	ENSG00000111215; ENSG00000282269; ENSG00000263247	n/a
UniProt	Q16378	n/a
RefSeq (mRNA)	NM_007244; NM_001098538	n/a
RefSeq (protein)	NP_001092008; NP_009175	n/a
Location (UCSC)	Chr 12: 10.85 – 10.85 Mb	n/a
PubMed search		n/a
- Wikidata
View/Edit Human

Proline-rich protein 4 is a protein that in humans is encoded by the PRR4 gene.

Lacrimal proline rich protein is a member of the proline-rich protein family which lacks a conserved repetitive domain. It may have a role in protective functions in the eye.
