= Tropocoronand ligand =

The tropocoronand ligand (H_{2}TC-m,n) is a macrocyclic ligand in which two aminotroponiminate rings are connected to one another via polymethylene linker chains of length m and n. Double deprotonation of the ligand yields a dianionic macrocylic species that is capable of binding divalent transition metal ions to form neutral complexes [M(TC-m,n)]. The 2-aminotroponeimine units are bridged by polymethylene linker chains with all four nitrogen atoms of the tropocoronand ligand bonded to a metal atom.

Tropocoronand ligands (TC-m,n) ^{2−} are known for a range of methylene bridges, m and n, in the arms connecting the two aminotroponiminate rings. They represent a new class of molecules with potential to be modified with a chiral moiety and applied to enantioselective reactions.

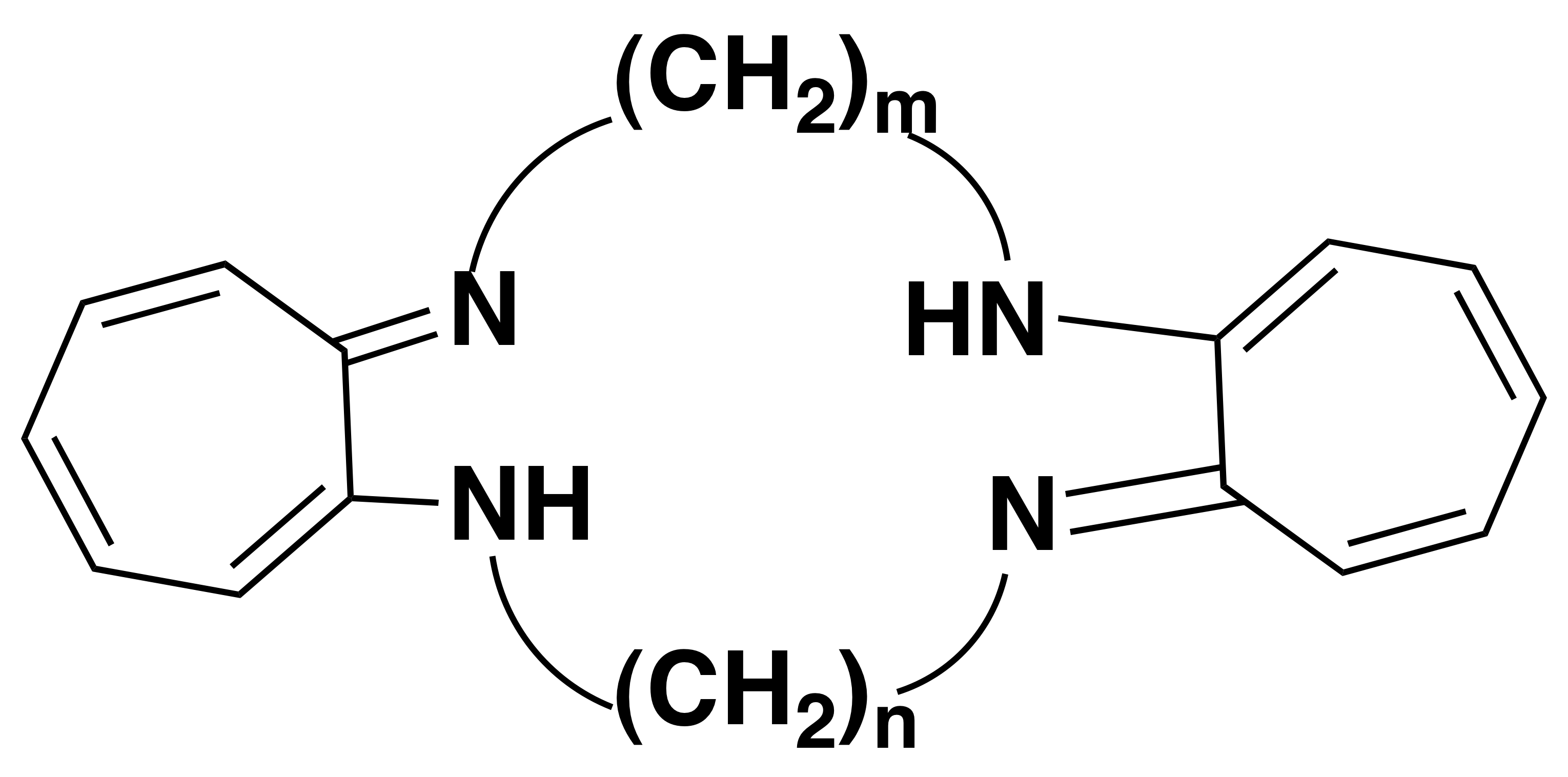
Tropocoronand ligand

== Synthesis ==
Symmetrical tropocoronands where m = n = 2 – 6 have been made in a four-step synthesis (Scheme 1) from tropolone.

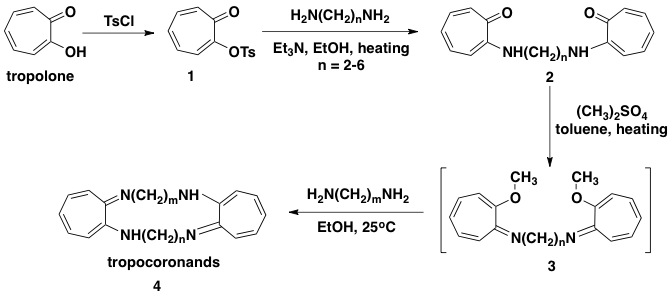
Synthesis of Tropocoronands

Either 2-tosyloxytropone (1) or 2-chlorotropone can be made from tropolone and then reacted with the appropriate diamine to give diaminodiketones 2. These diketones then give dialkoxydiimines 3 by treatment with dimethyl sulfate in refluxing toluene, or with triethyloxonium tetrafluoroborate in refluxing chloroform/hexamethylphosphoramide. The resulting dialkoxides can then undergo amine displacement and ring closure at 25 °C to form tropocoronands 4. Reported yields in the cyclization are generally in the range of 20 – 40%, but only 2% when m = n = 2. In most of the cases decreasing the straight-chain linkages size results in lower yields however Nozoe has demonstrated yields of 55– 65% for m = n = 3 using methylfluorosulfate in dichloromethane as the alkylating agent.

Asymmetrical tropocoronands where the number of carbons of the simple straight-chain linkages is different (m ≠ n, but variability in the m,n lengths tends to be only by 1 methylene group) as well as chiral tropocoronands can be synthesized using the method outlined in Scheme 1 with the modification of the last step where the straight-chain diamine can be substituted to the diamine with a different length of chain (m ≠ n) or to the chiral one. An alternative synthesis involves placing the chiral group in the sequence first to form a diaminoketone, followed by cyclization with a straight chain diamine in the last step.

== Tropocoronand complexes ==
Tropocoronand complexes with transition metals (Cu, Zn, Ni, Cd, Co, Rh, Fe, etc.) are synthesized by salt metathesis reactions.

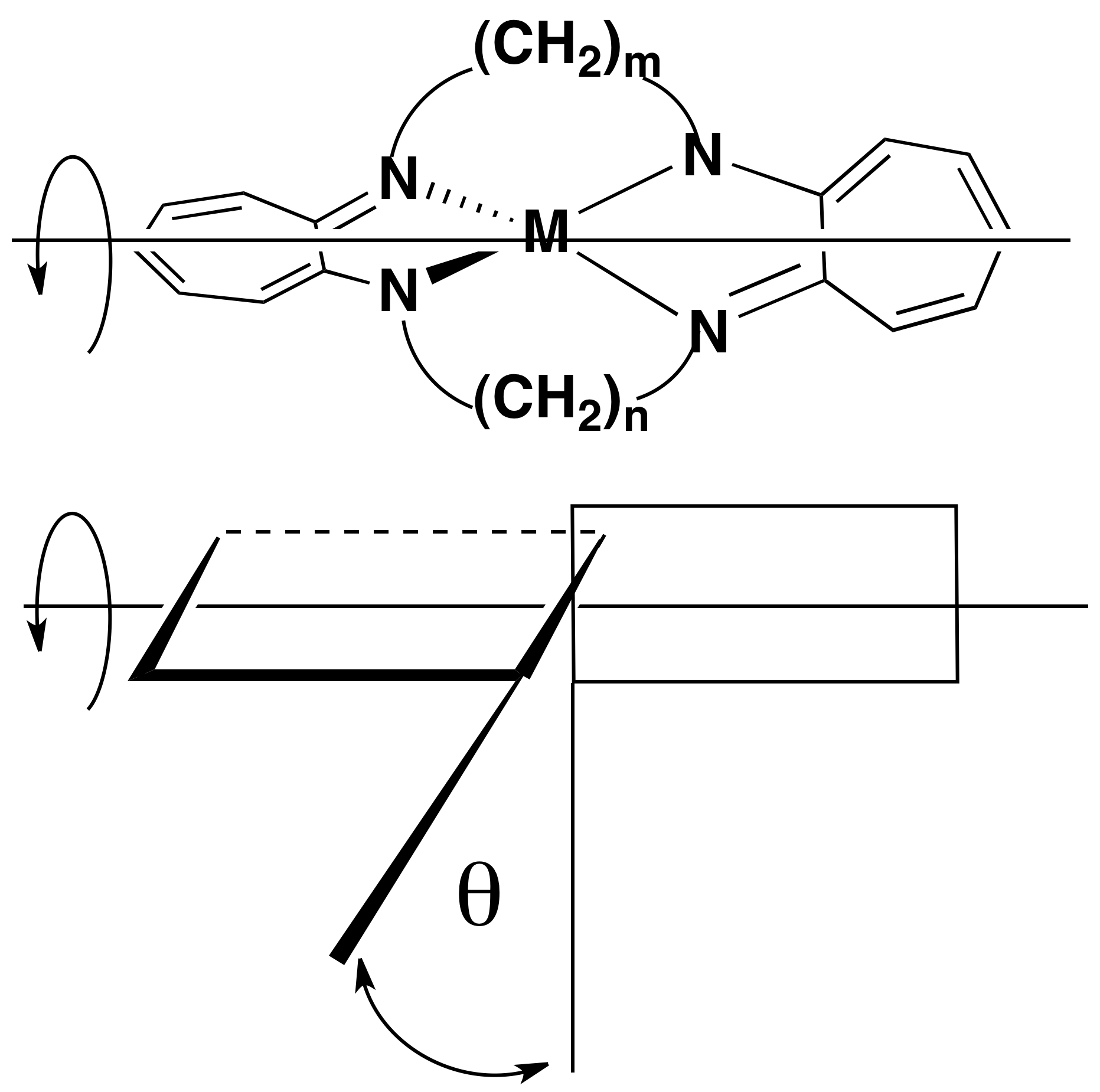
Dihedral angle of [M(TC-m,n)] complex. Note that tropocoronand zinc complexes exhibit significantly larger dihedral angles relative to their Cu analogs, which is likely a result of the larger metal ionic radius.

Dihedral angles for tropocoronand complexes with varied metal centers
n + m	Co	Ni	Zn
8	31.8°	28.9°	51.1°
9	58.7°	27.1°	59.7°
10	69.9°	70.1°	70.2°

Various metals (Zn(II), Cd(II), Co(II), Ni(II), Cu(II), etc.) have been studied in order to determine how the differences in macrocycle ring size, metal ionic radius, and electronic structure can affect the dihedral angle of the tropocoronand ligand. Structural analysis is indicative of a correlation between metal ion size and properties; for example, the relatively large Zn^{2+} ion prohibits the formation of a four-coordinate metal center with 14-membered tropocoronand complex [Zn(TC-3,3)]. Indeed, the tropocoronands with the larger zinc metal center exhibit significantly larger dihedral angles relative to their smaller copper congeners. However, the dihedral angles of the cadmium tropocoronand complexes are smaller despite the larger metal ion radius. This may be attributed to the increase in M—N distance with the larger metal. Studies of divalent Co^{2+} and Ni^{2+} complexes showed that the electronic structure of the transition metal ion affects the dihedral angle: the TC-4,5 ligand adopts a larger dihedral angle for the Co^{2+} ion, likely resulting due to its greater preference for tetrahedral over square-planar geometry as well as differences in ligand field stabilization energies (LFSE).

Metal-NO derivatives have been prepared. [Fe(TC-5,5)] also promotes NO disproportionation when in the presence of excess NO; however, in contrast to Mn, the final product is [Fe(NO)(TC-5,5-NO_{2})], where the iron retains the nitrosyl and the nitrite becomes bound to the ligand.

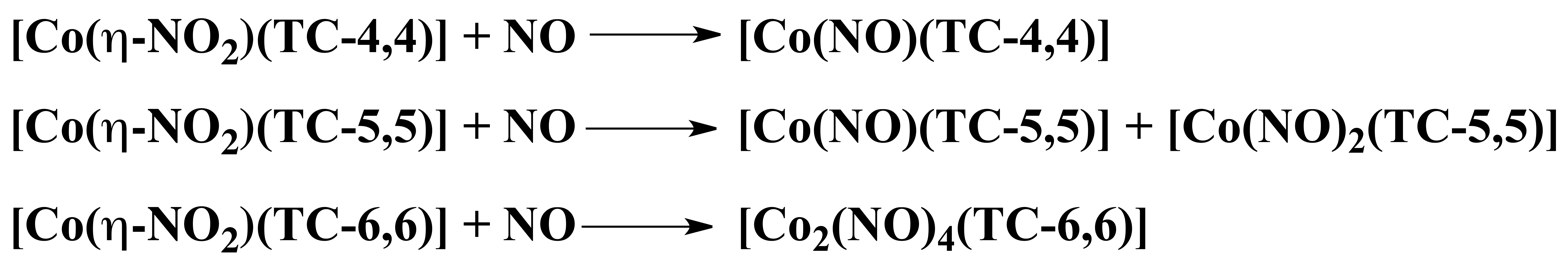
Variation of polymethylene linker chain
