= Mucoserous acinus =

Mucoserous acini (singular acinus) or mixed acini are mainly present in submandibular and sublingual glands. Mucoserous acini differ from mucous acini in that the latter contain only mucous cells and are generally tubular in shape, whereas mucoserous acini contain a mixture of both serous and mucous cells. In mucoserous acini, mucous cells typically form the main structure of the acinus. In histological preparations, serous cells may either interspersed among them or as crescent-shaped caps superficial to the mucous cells called serous demilunes (though this may be an artifact, see § Serous demilunes). Both cell types release their secretions directly into a shared lumen, contributing to a mixed, viscous and enzyme-rich fluid.

== Structure ==
In mucoserous acini, mucous cells typically form the main body of the acinus, producing mucin, a glycoprotein that lubricates the oral cavity. Serous cells secrete a watery, enzyme-rich fluid containing proteins such as lysozyme, contributing to the antimicrobial properties of saliva. Both cell types release their secretions directly into a shared lumen, facilitating the combined mucous and serous output characteristic of these glands.

== Serous demilunes ==
In histological preparations, the serous cells often appear to form crescent-shaped caps at the blind-end of mucous-cell surrounded acini. These are called serous demilunes, but they are considered an artifact resulting from traditional fixation methods. During fixation, mucous cells may swell, displacing the serous cells into a crescent shape. Advanced fixation techniques have demonstrated that serous and mucous cells are more uniformly distributed within the acinus than previously thought.

== Functional significance ==
The mixed secretion from mucoserous acini plays a crucial role in oral health. The mucous component aids in lubricating the oral cavity, facilitating speech and swallowing, while the serous component contains enzymes that initiate the digestion of carbohydrates and possess antimicrobial properties, thereby contributing to the maintenance of oral hygiene.
