= Torus tubarius =

Elevated mucous membrane in the nasopharynx

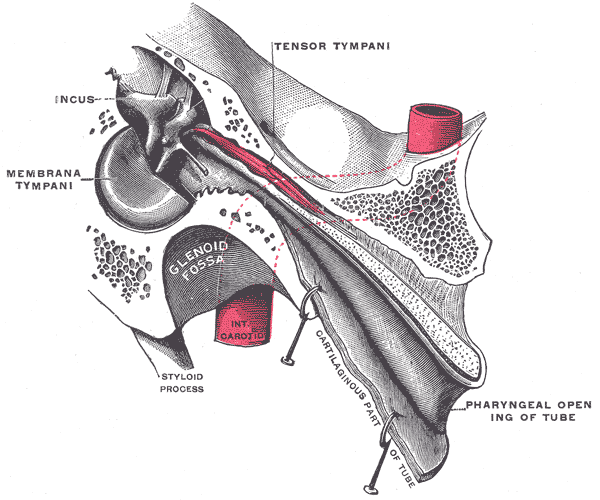
- Auditory tube, laid open by a cut in its long axis (torus tubarius not labeled)

Details

Identifiers
- Latin: torus tubarius
- TA98: A05.3.01.012
- TA2: 2868
- FMA: 54993

The torus tubarius (or torus of the auditory tube) is an elevation of the mucous membrane of the nasal part of the pharynx formed by the underlying base of the cartilaginous portion of the Eustachian tube (auditory tube). The torus tubarius is situated behind the pharyngeal orifice of the auditory tube.

The torus tubarius is very close to the tubal tonsil, which is sometimes also referred to as the tonsil of (the) torus tubarius. Two folds run anteriorly and posteriorly to the torus tubarius: the salpingopalatine fold (anteriorly), and the salpingopharyngeal fold (posteriorly).

== See also ==
- Tubarial salivary gland
