= Serous fluid =

Transparent or pale-colored body fluid resembling serum

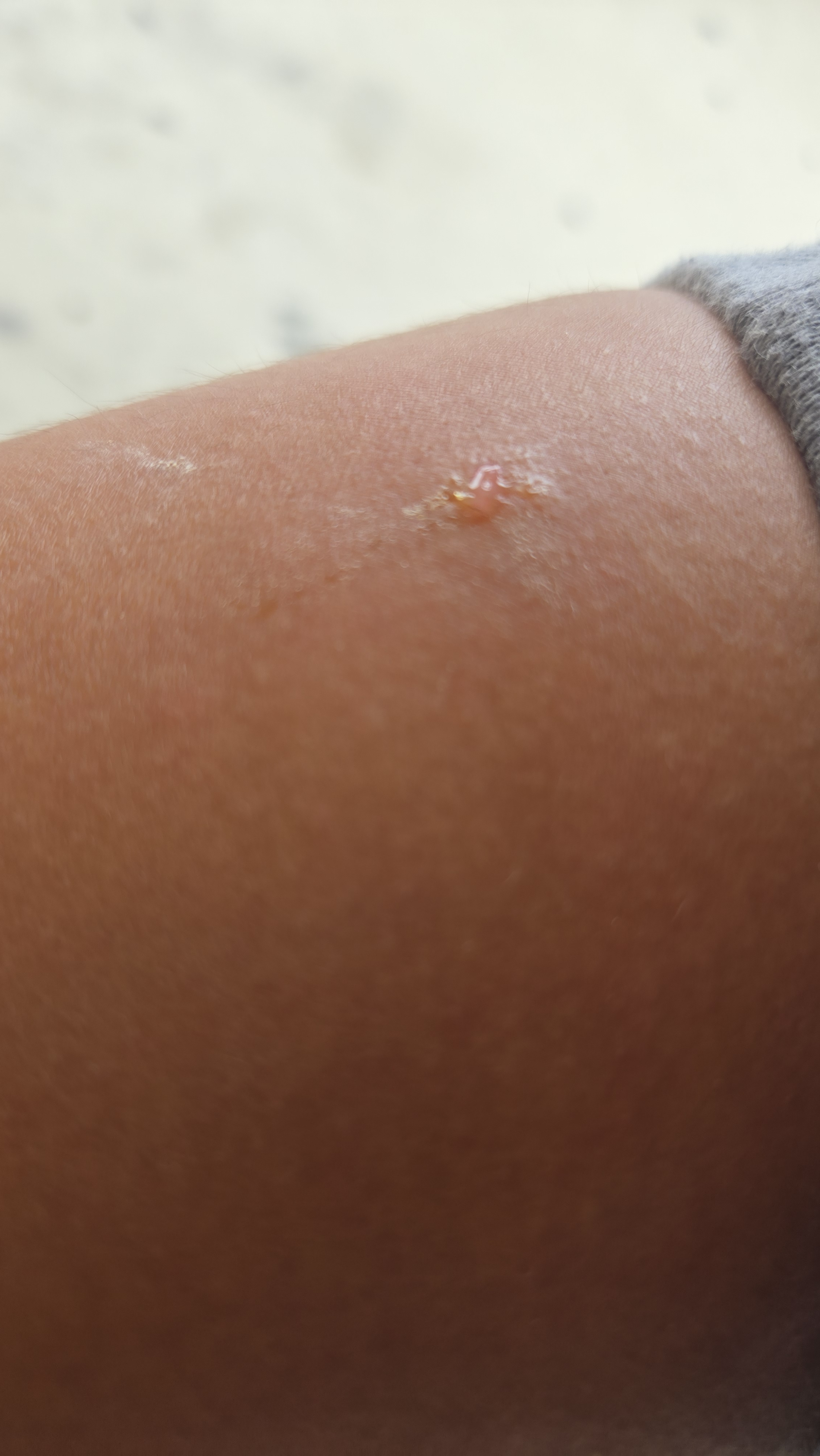
Serous fluid exuding from a scratched mosquito bite

In physiology, serous fluid or serosal fluid (originating from the Medieval Latin word serosus, from Latin serum) is any of various body fluids resembling serum, that are typically pale yellow or transparent and of a benign nature. The fluid fills the inside of body cavities. Serous fluid originates from serous glands, with secretions enriched with proteins and water. Serous fluid may also originate from mixed glands, which contain both mucous and serous cells. A common trait of serous fluids is their role in assisting digestion, excretion, and respiration.

In medical fields, especially cytopathology, serous fluid is a synonym for effusion fluids from various body cavities. Examples of effusion fluid are pleural effusion and pericardial effusion. There are many causes of effusions which include involvement of the cavity by cancer. Cancer in a serous cavity is called a serous carcinoma. Cytopathology evaluation is recommended to evaluate the causes of effusions in these cavities.

== Examples ==
Saliva consists of mucus and serous fluid; the serous fluid contains the enzyme amylase, which is important for the digestion of carbohydrates. Minor salivary glands of von Ebner present on the tongue secrete the lipase. The parotid gland produces purely serous saliva. The other major salivary glands produce mixed (serous and mucus) saliva.

Another type of serous fluid is secreted by the serous membranes (serosa), two-layered membranes which line the body cavities. Serous membrane fluid collects on microvilli on the outer layer and acts as a lubricant and reduces friction from muscle movement. This can be seen in the lungs, with the pleural cavity.

Pericardial fluid is a serous fluid secreted by the serous layer of the pericardium into the pericardial cavity. The pericardium consists of two layers, an outer fibrous layer and the inner serous layer. This serous layer has two membranes which enclose the pericardial cavity into which is secreted the pericardial fluid.

Blood serum is the component of blood that is neither a blood cell nor a clotting factor. Blood serum and blood plasma are similar, but serum does not contain any clotting factors such as fibrinogen, prothrombin, thromboplastin and many others. Serum includes all proteins not used in coagulation (clotting) and all the electrolytes, antibodies, antigens, hormones and any exogenous substances, such as drugs and microorganisms.

== See also ==
- Seroma
