= PRB3 =

Protein-coding gene in the species Homo sapiens

Identifiers
- Aliases: PRB3, G1, PRG, proline-rich protein BstNI subfamily 3, proline rich protein BstNI subfamily 3
- External IDs: OMIM: 168840; GeneCards: PRB3

Gene location (Human)
Chr.	Chromosome 12 (human)
Band	12p13.2	Start	11,265,914 bp
Band	12p13.2	End	11,269,707 bp
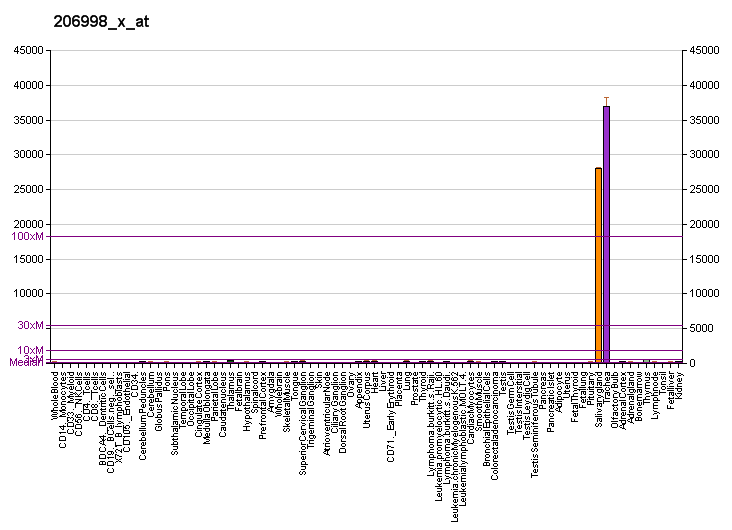

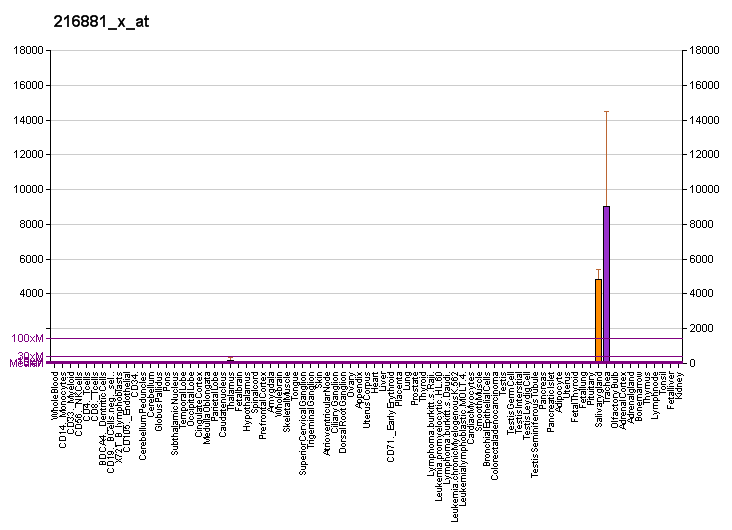
RNA expression pattern
Bgee	Human / Mouse (ortholog); Top expressed in: olfactory zone of nasal mucosa; testicle; gonad; tonsil; bone marrow; bone marrow cell; sural nerve; salivary gland; left testis; right testis / n/a; More reference expression data
BioGPS	More reference expression data
Orthologs
Databases	NCBI: entry; OMA: entry
Species	Human	Mouse
Entrez	5544	n/a
Ensembl	ENSG00000197870; ENSG00000275624	n/a
UniProt	Q04118	n/a
RefSeq (mRNA)	NM_006249; NM_001394862	n/a
RefSeq (protein)	n/a	n/a
Location (UCSC)	Chr 12: 11.27 – 11.27 Mb	n/a
PubMed search		n/a
- Wikidata
View/Edit Human

Basic salivary proline-rich protein 3 is a protein that in humans is encoded by the PRB3 gene.

The protein encoded by this gene is a proline-rich salivary protein. It is a major constituent of parotid saliva. This protein is proposed to act as a bacterial receptor. This gene and five other genes that also encode salivary proline-rich proteins (PRPs), as well as a gene encoding a lacrimal gland PRP, form a PRP gene cluster in the chromosomal 12p13 region.
