= PREB =

Protein-coding gene in the species Homo sapiens

Identifiers
- Aliases: PREB, SEC12, prolactin regulatory element binding
- External IDs: OMIM: 606395; MGI: 1355326; GeneCards: PREB

Gene location (Human)
Chr.	Chromosome 2 (human)
Band	2p23.3	Start	27,130,756 bp
Band	2p23.3	End	27,134,666 bp

Gene location (Mouse)
Chr.	Chromosome 5 (mouse)
Band	5|5 B1	Start	30,950,853 bp
Band	5|5 B1	End	30,960,361 bp
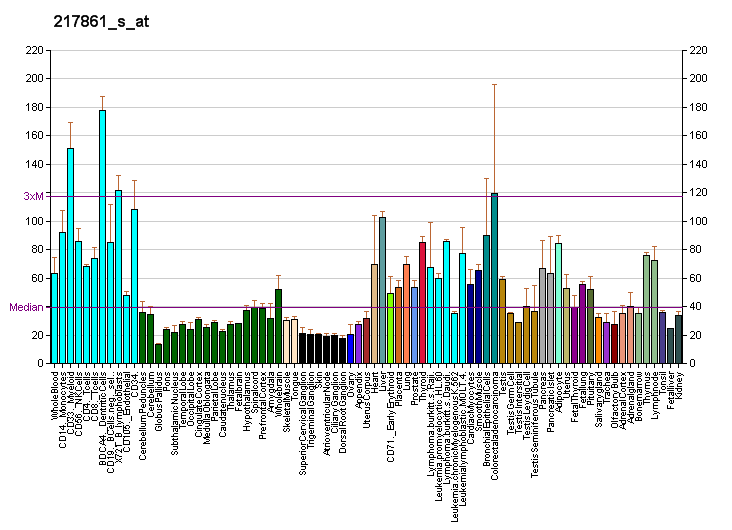
RNA expression pattern
Bgee	Human / Mouse (ortholog); Top expressed in: right lobe of liver; gastrocnemius muscle; left uterine tube; muscle of thigh; body of pancreas; apex of heart; body of uterus; right ovary; granulocyte; mucosa of transverse colon / Top expressed in: fossa; condyle; Paneth cell; granulocyte; motor neuron; seminal vesicula; yolk sac; internal carotid artery; neural layer of retina; endothelial cell of lymphatic vessel; More reference expression data
BioGPS	More reference expression data
Gene ontology
Molecular function	DNA binding; guanyl-nucleotide exchange factor activity; protein binding; GTPase activator activity; GTPase binding
Cellular component	integral component of membrane; endoplasmic reticulum membrane; membrane; endoplasmic reticulum; endoplasmic reticulum exit site; Golgi membrane; nucleus; integral component of endoplasmic reticulum membrane
Biological process	protein transport; IRE1-mediated unfolded protein response; vesicle-mediated transport; transcription, DNA-templated; positive regulation of GTPase activity; regulation of transcription, DNA-templated; COPII vesicle coating; protein exit from endoplasmic reticulum; endoplasmic reticulum to Golgi vesicle-mediated transport; regulation of COPII vesicle coating; protein secretion; transport; regulation of molecular function; regulation of catalytic activity
Sources:Amigo / QuickGO
Orthologs
Databases	NCBI: entry; OMA: entry
Species	Human	Mouse
Entrez	10113	50907
Ensembl	ENSG00000138073	ENSMUSG00000045302
UniProt	Q9HCU5	Q9WUQ2
RefSeq (mRNA)	NM_001330484; NM_001330485; NM_001330486; NM_001330487; NM_013388	NM_001294302; NM_016703
RefSeq (protein)	NP_001317413; NP_001317414; NP_001317415; NP_001317416; NP_037520	NP_001281231; NP_057912
Location (UCSC)	Chr 2: 27.13 – 27.13 Mb	Chr 5: 30.95 – 30.96 Mb
PubMed search
- Wikidata
View/Edit Human	View/Edit Mouse

Prolactin regulatory element-binding protein is a protein that in humans is encoded by the PREB gene.

This gene encodes a protein that specifically binds to a Pit1-binding element of the prolactin (PRL) promoter. This protein may act as a transcriptional regulator and is thought to be involved in some of the developmental abnormalities observed in patients with partial trisomy 2p. This gene overlaps the abhydrolase domain containing 1 (ABHD1) gene on the opposite strand.
