= Histatin 3 =

Protein-coding gene in the species Homo sapiens

HTN3

Identifiers
- Aliases: HTN3, HIS2, HTN2, HTN5, histatin 3, PB
- External IDs: OMIM: 142702; GeneCards: HTN3

Gene location (Human)
Chr.	Chromosome 4 (human)
Band	4q13.3	Start	70,028,455 bp
Band	4q13.3	End	70,036,538 bp
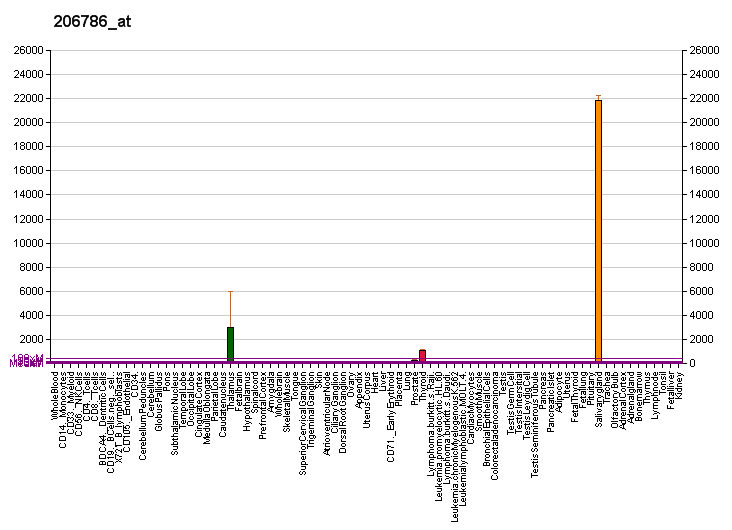
RNA expression pattern
Bgee	Human / Mouse (ortholog); Top expressed in: testicle; gonad; placenta; tonsil; bone marrow; olfactory zone of nasal mucosa; anterior pituitary; muscle of thigh; epithelium of colon; skeletal muscle tissue / n/a; More reference expression data
BioGPS	More reference expression data
Gene ontology
Molecular function	protein binding; metal ion binding
Cellular component	extracellular region; extracellular space
Biological process	biomineral tissue development; defense response to bacterium; defense response to fungus; antimicrobial humoral response; killing of cells of other organism; antimicrobial humoral immune response mediated by antimicrobial peptide
Sources:Amigo / QuickGO
Orthologs
Databases	NCBI: entry; OMA: entry
Species	Human	Mouse
Entrez	3347	n/a
Ensembl	ENSG00000205649; ENSG00000282967	n/a
UniProt	P15516	n/a
RefSeq (mRNA)	NM_000200	n/a
RefSeq (protein)	NP_000191	n/a
Location (UCSC)	Chr 4: 70.03 – 70.04 Mb	n/a
PubMed search		n/a
- Wikidata
View/Edit Human

Histatin 3, also known as HTN3, is a protein which in humans is encoded by the HTN3 gene.

== Function ==
The primary protein encoded by HTN3 is histatin 3. Histatins are a family of small, histidine-rich, salivary proteins, encoded by at least two loci (HTN3 and HTN1). Post-translational proteolytic processing results in many histatins: e.g., histatins 4-6 are derived from histatin 3 by proteolysis. Histatins 1 and 3 are primary products of HIS1(1) and HIS2(1) alleles, respectively. Histatins are believed to have important non-immunological, anti-microbial function in the oral cavity. Histatin 1 and histatin 2 are major wound-closing factors in human saliva.

allele	gene	protein
HIS1	HTN1	histatin 1
HIS2	HTN3	histatin 3 → histatins 4-6
