= PRB4 =

Protein-coding gene in the species Homo sapiens

Identifiers
- Aliases: PRB4, Po, proline-rich protein BstNI subfamily 4, proline rich protein BstNI subfamily 4
- External IDs: OMIM: 180990; GeneCards: PRB4

Gene location (Human)
Chr.	Chromosome 12 (human)
Band	12p13.2	Start	11,307,077 bp
Band	12p13.2	End	11,310,436 bp
RNA expression pattern
Bgee	Human / Mouse (ortholog); Top expressed in: olfactory zone of nasal mucosa; epithelium of colon; tonsil; bone marrow; liver; urinary bladder; skin of abdomen; skin of leg; blood; lymph node / n/a; More reference expression data
BioGPS	n/a
Gene ontology
Molecular function	molecular function
Cellular component	extracellular region
Biological process	biological process
Sources:Amigo / QuickGO
Orthologs
Databases	NCBI: entry; OMA: entry
Species	Human	Mouse
Entrez	5545	n/a
Ensembl	ENSG00000274839; ENSG00000230657	n/a
UniProt	P10163	n/a
RefSeq (mRNA)	NM_002723; NM_001261399	n/a
RefSeq (protein)	n/a	n/a
Location (UCSC)	Chr 12: 11.31 – 11.31 Mb	n/a
PubMed search		n/a
- Wikidata
View/Edit Human

Basic salivary proline-rich protein 4 is a protein that in humans is encoded by the PRB4 gene.

The protein encoded by this gene is a proline-rich salivary protein. This gene and five other genes that also encode salivary proline-rich proteins (PRPs), as well as a gene encoding a lacrimal gland PRP, form a PRP gene cluster in the chromosomal 12p13 region.

PRB4 is post-translationally cleaved into three different mature peptides:

- Protein N1
- Glycosylated protein A
- Peptide P-D (also known as proline-rich peptide IB-5)
