= PRB1 =

Protein-coding gene in the species Homo sapiens

Identifiers
- Aliases: PRB1, PM, PMF, PMS, PRB1L, PRB1M, proline rich protein BstNI subfamily 1, proline rich protein BstNI subfamily 1 (gene/pseudogene)
- External IDs: OMIM: 180989; MGI: 1924007; GeneCards: PRB1

Gene location (Human)
Chr.	Chromosome 12 (human)
Band	12p13.2	Start	11,351,823 bp
Band	12p13.2	End	11,355,591 bp

Gene location (Mouse)
Chr.	Chromosome 10 (mouse)
Band	10|10 A4	Start	32,956,550 bp
Band	10|10 A4	End	33,352,705 bp
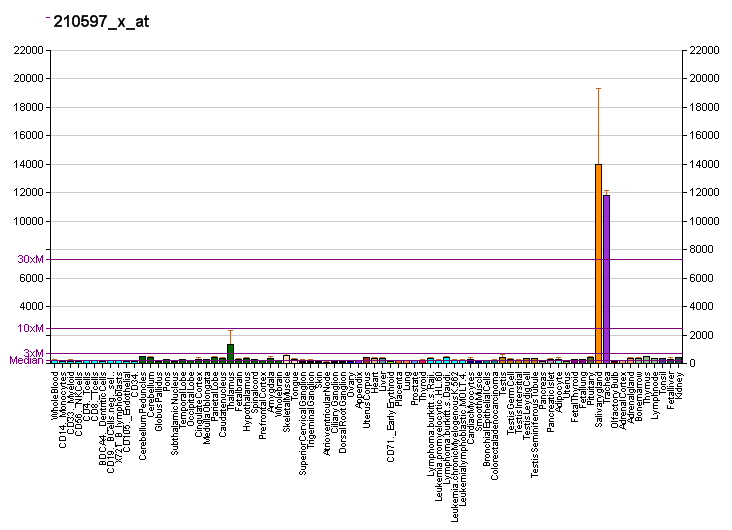

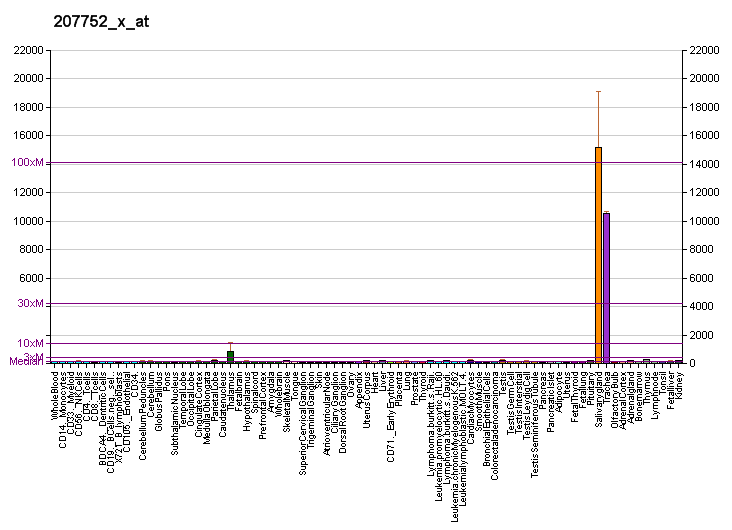
RNA expression pattern
Bgee	Human / Mouse (ortholog); Top expressed in: olfactory zone of nasal mucosa; tonsil; bone marrow; sural nerve; bone marrow cell; putamen; caudate nucleus; nucleus accumbens; skin of leg; superior frontal gyrus / Top expressed in: ankle; triceps brachii muscle; muscle of thigh; extraocular muscle; temporal muscle; sternocleidomastoid muscle; interventricular septum; vastus lateralis muscle; tibialis anterior muscle; digastric muscle; More reference expression data
BioGPS	More reference expression data
Gene ontology
Molecular function	molecular function
Cellular component	extracellular region
Biological process	biological process
Sources:Amigo / QuickGO
Orthologs
Databases	NCBI: entry; OMA: entry
Species	Human	Mouse
Entrez	5542	76757
Ensembl	ENSG00000251655	ENSMUSG00000019787
UniProt	P04280	E9Q9K5
RefSeq (mRNA)	NM_199354; NM_005039; NM_199353; NM_001367912	NM_029726; NM_001364696; NM_001364697
RefSeq (protein)	NP_005030; NP_001354841	NP_084002; NP_001351625; NP_001351626
Location (UCSC)	Chr 12: 11.35 – 11.36 Mb	Chr 10: 32.96 – 33.35 Mb
PubMed search
- Wikidata
View/Edit Human	View/Edit Mouse

Basic salivary proline-rich protein 1 is a protein that in humans is encoded by the PRB1 gene.

The protein encoded by this gene is a proline-rich salivary protein. This gene and five other genes that also encode salivary proline-rich proteins (PRPs), as well as a gene encoding a lacrimal gland PRP, form a PRP gene cluster in the chromosomal 12p13 region. Alternatively spliced transcript variants encoding distinct isoforms have been described.
