= PRH2 =

Protein-coding gene in the species Homo sapiens

Identifiers
- Aliases: PRH2, PIF-S, PRH1, PRP-1/PRP-2, Pr, db-s, pa, pr1/Pr2, Proline-rich protein haeiii subfamily 2, proline rich protein HaeIII subfamily 2
- External IDs: OMIM: 168790; GeneCards: PRH2

Gene location (Human)
Chr.	Chromosome 12 (human)
Band	12p13.2	Start	10,929,236 bp
Band	12p13.2	End	10,934,845 bp
RNA expression pattern
Bgee	Human / Mouse (ortholog); Top expressed in: testicle; olfactory zone of nasal mucosa; tonsil; placenta; bone marrow cell; corpus callosum; Achilles tendon; cerebellar hemisphere; mucosa of large intestine; sural nerve / n/a; More reference expression data
BioGPS	n/a
Orthologs
Databases	NCBI: entry; OMA: entry
Species	Human	Mouse
Entrez	5555	n/a
Ensembl	ENSG00000134551; ENSG00000275679; ENSG00000272803	n/a
UniProt	P02810	n/a
RefSeq (mRNA)	NM_005042; NM_001110213	n/a
RefSeq (protein)	NP_001103683	n/a
Location (UCSC)	Chr 12: 10.93 – 10.93 Mb	n/a
PubMed search		n/a
- Wikidata
View/Edit Human

Proline-rich protein HaeIII subfamily 2 is a protein that in humans is encoded by the PRH2 gene.
