= Serous gland =

Gland that secretes serous fluid

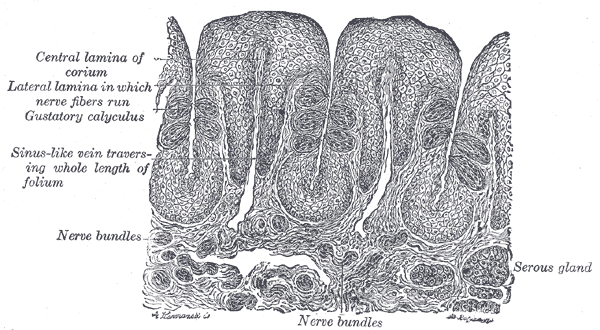
- Vertical section of papilla foliata of the rabbit, passing across the folia. (Serous gland labeled at bottom right.)

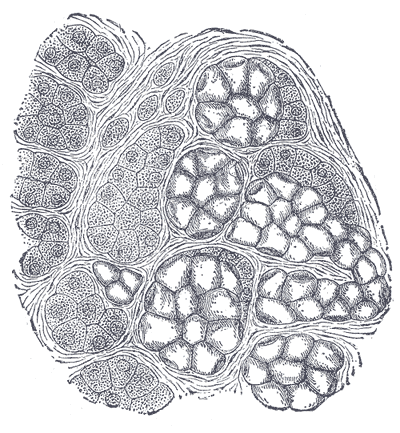
- Human submaxillary gland. At the right is a group of mucous alveoli, at the left a group of serous alveoli.

Details
- Precursor: Epithelial tissue
- System: Exocrine system

Identifiers
- Latin: glandula serosa
- TH: H2.00.02.0.03035
- FMA: 62889

Serous glands secrete serous fluid. They contain serous acini, a grouping of serous cells that secrete serous fluid, isotonic with blood plasma, that contains enzymes such as alpha-amylase.

Serous glands are most common in the parotid gland and lacrimal gland but are also present in the submandibular gland and, to a far lesser extent, the sublingual gland.

== Structure ==
=== Serous acinar cells ===
Serous acinar cells are the primary secretory cells of serous glands. They have a characteristic pyramidal shape, with a broad base that rests on the basement membrane and a narrow apex that faces the lumen of the acinus. These cells typically form spherical or tubular structures called acini (singular: acinus), which are the basic functional units of exocrine glands.

Histologically, serous acinar cells exhibit:

- A round, basally located nucleus
- Extensive rough endoplasmic reticulum in the basal cytoplasm, giving it a basophilic appearance in H&E stains
- Numerous secretory granules (zymogen granules) in the apical cytoplasm
- Prominent Golgi apparatus in the supranuclear region
- Well-developed cell junctions, including tight junctions and desmosomes

These cells are organized into acini that connect to intercalated ducts, which then merge to form larger excretory ducts.

=== Ultrastructure ===
Under electron microscopy, serous acinar cells reveal:

- Abundant rough endoplasmic reticulum arranged in parallel cisternae
- Numerous free ribosomes
- Large, electron-dense secretory granules containing inactive digestive enzymes
- Extensive lateral interdigitations between adjacent cells
- Well-developed golgi complexes
- Mitochondria concentrated in the basal and perinuclear regions

== Development ==
Serous acinar cells, like other exocrine secretory cells, develop through a process of branching morphogenesis and cellular differentiation.

=== Embryological origin ===
- Salivary gland serous acinar cells derive from the oral ectoderm
- Pancreatic acinar cells originate from the endoderm of the foregut
- Lacrimal gland acinar cells develop from surface ectoderm

=== Developmental process ===
The development of serous acinar cells follows several key stages:

1. Initial budding of epithelium into the underlying mesenchyme
2. Branching morphogenesis guided by epithelial-mesenchymal interactions
3. Formation of terminal end buds that will become acini
4. Cell differentiation with acquisition of secretory machinery
5. Maturation of secretory pathways and enzyme production

=== Molecular regulation ===
Several signaling pathways and transcription factors regulate the development of serous acinar cells:

- FGF (Fibroblast Growth Factor) signaling - critical for branching morphogenesis
- Notch signaling - important for cell fate decisions
- SOX9 - transcription factor essential for acinar cell differentiation
- MIST1 (BHLHA15) - transcription factor required for complete maturation of secretory phenotype
- PTF1A - pancreas-specific transcription factor necessary for pancreatic acinar cell development

The timing of differentiation varies by tissue, with full functional maturation of many serous acinar cells occurring postnatally, particularly in salivary and lacrimal glands.

== Function ==
Serous acinar cells specialize in the synthesis, storage, and secretion of protein-rich, enzyme-containing fluids. Their primary functions include:

=== Secretory activity ===
Serous acinar cells produce watery, protein-rich secretions containing various enzymes including:

- Alpha-amylase (particularly abundant in salivary glands)
- Lipase
- DNase
- Lysozyme
- Lactoferrin
- Peroxidase
- Various proteases (depending on the specific gland)

=== Secretory mechanism ===
Serous acinar cells utilize the merocrine secretion mechanism, whereby secretory products are released via exocytosis without loss of cellular material. The process involves: 1. Synthesis of proteins in the rough endoplasmic reticulum 2. Modification and packaging in the Golgi apparatus 3. Storage in zymogen granules 4. Fusion of granules with the apical plasma membrane and release of contents into the lumen

Secretion is primarily regulated by autonomic nervous system signals, particularly through muscarinic cholinergic and beta-adrenergic receptors.

== Distribution ==
Serous acinar cells are found in various exocrine glands throughout the body:

=== Salivary glands ===
- Parotid gland (purely serous)
- Submandibular gland (mixed, but predominantly serous)
- Sublingual gland (primarily mucous with some serous demilunes)
- Minor salivary glands (varying proportions)

=== Other locations ===
- Lacrimal glands
- Pancreas (pancreatic acinar cells are a specialized type of serous cell)
- Von Ebner's glands in the tongue
- Certain sweat glands
- Bronchial submucosal glands (mixed with mucous cells)

== Clinical significance ==
Serous acinar cells are involved in several pathological conditions:

=== Disorders ===
- Sjögren's syndrome - autoimmune destruction of lacrimal and salivary glands leading to xerostomia and xerophthalmia
- Sialadenitis - inflammation of salivary glands
- Radiation-induced salivary gland dysfunction
- Cystic fibrosis - affects protein secretion in various exocrine glands

=== Neoplasms ===
- Acinic cell carcinoma - malignant epithelial neoplasm showing differentiation toward serous acinar cells, primarily in salivary glands
- Pleomorphic adenoma - benign mixed tumor often containing serous acinar-like cells
- Warthin's tumor - benign salivary gland tumor

== See also ==
- Acinus
- Exocrine gland
- Mucous gland
- Zymogen
