= Von Ebner's gland =

Exocrine glands found in the mouth

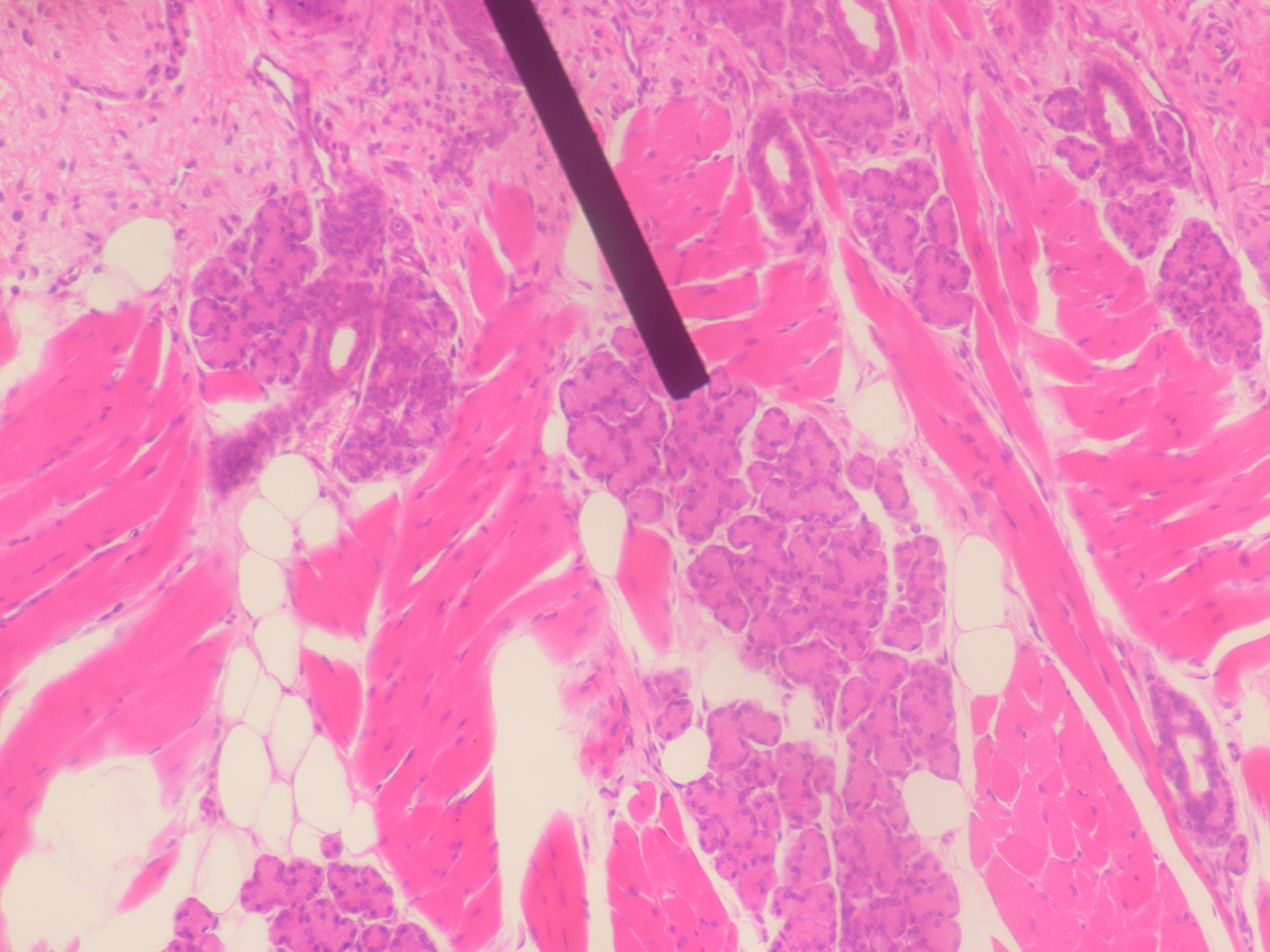
Human Von Ebner's gland

Von Ebner's glands, also called Ebner's glands or gustatory glands, are exocrine glands found in the mouth. More specifically, they are serous salivary glands which reside adjacent to the moats surrounding the circumvallate and foliate papillae just anterior to the posterior third of the tongue in its submucosa, anterior to the terminal sulcus.

These glands are named after Victor von Ebner, an Austrian histologist.

These glands empty their serous secretion into the base of the moats around the foliate and circumvallate papillae. This secretion presumably flushes material from the mouth to enable the taste buds to respond rapidly to changing stimuli.

Von Ebner's glands are innervated by cranial nerve IX, the glossopharyngeal nerve.

== In non-human animals ==
In rats and mice, Von Ebner's glands secrete lingual lipase, which is homologous to human gastric lipase (produced in the stomach). This begins the process of lipid hydrolysis in the mouth.

== See also ==
- List of distinct cell types in the adult human body
