= STATH =

Protein-coding gene in humans

Identifiers
- Aliases: STATH, STR, statherin
- External IDs: OMIM: 184470; GeneCards: STATH

Gene location (Human)
Chr.	Chromosome 4 (human)
Band	4q13.3	Start	69,995,966 bp
Band	4q13.3	End	70,002,570 bp
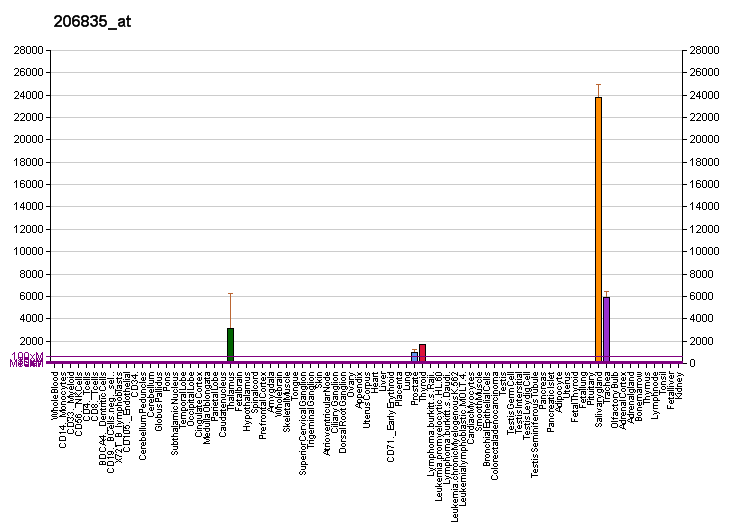
RNA expression pattern
Bgee	Human / Mouse (ortholog); Top expressed in: olfactory zone of nasal mucosa; salivary gland; minor salivary glands; tonsil; testicle; placenta; bone marrow; bone marrow cell; gonad; skeletal muscle tissue / n/a; More reference expression data
BioGPS	More reference expression data
Gene ontology
Molecular function	extracellular matrix constituent, lubricant activity; hydroxyapatite binding; structural constituent of tooth enamel; protein binding
Cellular component	extracellular region
Biological process	defense response to bacterium; negative regulation of bone mineralization; ossification; saliva secretion; biomineral tissue development; regulation of bone mineralization
Sources:Amigo / QuickGO
Orthologs
Databases	NCBI: entry; OMA: entry
Species	Human	Mouse
Entrez	6779	n/a
Ensembl	ENSG00000282891; ENSG00000126549	n/a
UniProt	P02808	n/a
RefSeq (mRNA)	NM_003154; NM_001009181	n/a
RefSeq (protein)	NP_001009181; NP_003145	n/a
Location (UCSC)	Chr 4: 70 – 70 Mb	n/a
PubMed search		n/a
- Wikidata
View/Edit Human

Statherin is a protein in humans that is encoded by the STATH gene. It prevents the precipitation of calcium phosphate in saliva, maintaining a high calcium level in saliva available for remineralisation of tooth enamel and high phosphate levels for buffering.
