= Histatin 1 =

Protein-coding gene in the species Homo sapiens

HTN1

Identifiers
- Aliases: HTN1, HIS1, histatin 1
- External IDs: OMIM: 142701; GeneCards: HTN1

Gene location (Human)
Chr.	Chromosome 4 (human)
Band	4q13.3	Start	70,050,438 bp
Band	4q13.3	End	70,058,848 bp
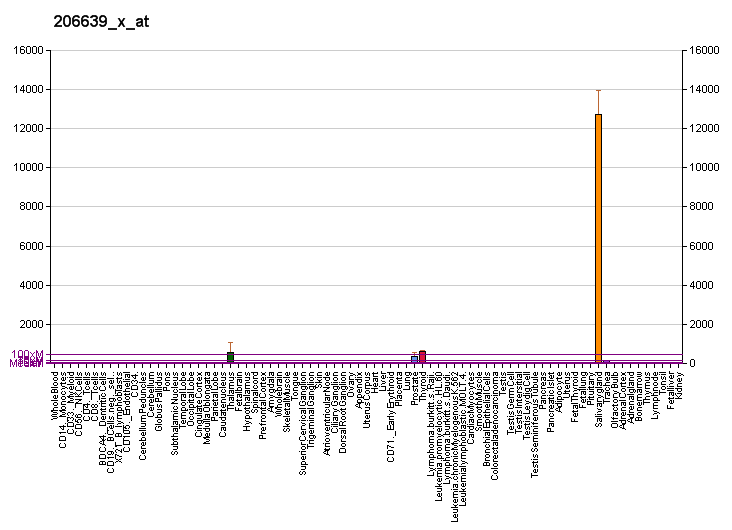
RNA expression pattern
Bgee	Human / Mouse (ortholog); Top expressed in: testicle; olfactory zone of nasal mucosa; salivary gland; minor salivary glands; placenta; tonsil; bone marrow; skeletal muscle tissue; urinary bladder; monocyte / n/a; More reference expression data
BioGPS	More reference expression data
Gene ontology
Molecular function	protein binding
Cellular component	extracellular region; extracellular space
Biological process	biomineral tissue development; defense response to bacterium; defense response to fungus; antimicrobial humoral response; killing of cells of other organism
Sources:Amigo / QuickGO
Orthologs
Databases	NCBI: entry; OMA: entry
Species	Human	Mouse
Entrez	3346	n/a
Ensembl	ENSG00000283046; ENSG00000126550	n/a
UniProt	P15515	n/a
RefSeq (mRNA)	NM_002159; NM_001368990	n/a
RefSeq (protein)	NP_002150; NP_001355919	n/a
Location (UCSC)	Chr 4: 70.05 – 70.06 Mb	n/a
PubMed search		n/a
- Wikidata
View/Edit Human

Histatin-1 is a protein that in humans is encoded by the HTN1 gene.
