= PRH1 =

Protein-coding gene in the species Homo sapiens

Identifiers
- Aliases: PRH1, PA, Db-s, PIF-S, PRH2, Pr1/Pr2, proline-rich protein HaeIII subfamily 1, proline rich protein HaeIII subfamily 1, PRP-1/PRP-2
- External IDs: OMIM: 168730; GeneCards: PRH1

Gene location (Human)
Chr.	Chromosome 12 (human)
Band	12p13.2	Start	10,824,960 bp
Band	12p13.2	End	11,171,608 bp
RNA expression pattern
Bgee	Human / Mouse (ortholog); Top expressed in: left testis; right testis; corpus callosum; testicle; Achilles tendon; bone marrow cell; gonad; tonsil; epithelium of colon; olfactory zone of nasal mucosa / n/a; More reference expression data
BioGPS	n/a
Orthologs
Databases	NCBI: entry; OMA: entry
Species	Human	Mouse
Entrez	5554	n/a
Ensembl	ENSG00000231887; ENSG00000277823	n/a
UniProt	P02810	n/a
RefSeq (mRNA)	NM_006250; NM_001291314; NM_001291315; NM_001393989	n/a
RefSeq (protein)	NP_001103683	n/a
Location (UCSC)	Chr 12: 10.82 – 11.17 Mb	n/a
PubMed search		n/a
- Wikidata
View/Edit Human

Salivary acidic proline-rich phosphoprotein 1/2 is a protein that in humans is encoded by the PRH1 gene.
