= Sialodochitis =

Medical condition

Sialodochitis (also termed ductal sialadenitis), is inflammation of the duct system of a salivary gland. This is compared to sialadenitis, which is inflammation of the gland parenchyma.

Sialodochitis may be associated with salivary duct strictures and salivary stones.

It is common in both the parotid glands and submandibular glands.

The treatment is as for sialadenitis.

== Diagnosis ==
It may appear on a CT scan or MRI scan as enhancement and dilation of the duct (sialectasis).

On sialography, it may appear as segments of duct dilation and stenosis. This is sometimes termed the 'sausage link appearance'.

== Sialodochitis fibrinosa ==
This is a rare condition, probably caused by an allergic reaction, in which there is sudden swelling of the salivary glands. It is associated with other allergic conditions such as asthma, urticaria, allergic rhinitis and food allergy.
