= Parotitis =

Inflammation of the parotid glands

- Pouting of opening of Stensen's duct, which may be seen in parotitis
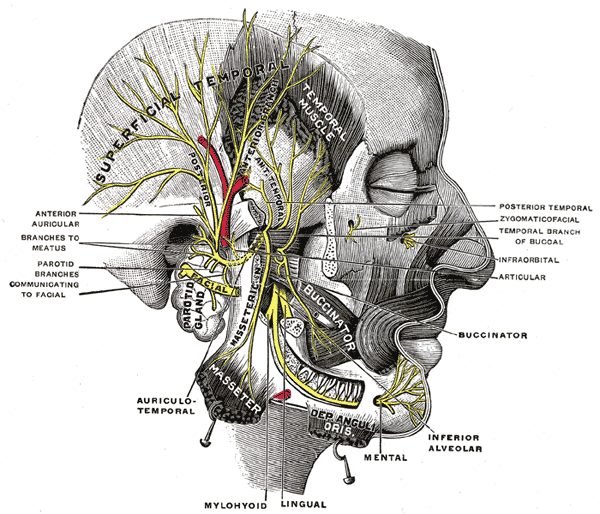
- Parotid gland (center left)
- Specialty: Infectious diseases

Parotitis is an inflammation of one or both parotid glands, the major salivary glands located on either side of the face, in humans. The parotid gland is the salivary gland most commonly affected by inflammation.

== Etymology ==
From Greek παρωτῖτις (νόσος), parōtĩtis (nósos) : (disease of the) parotid gland < παρωτίς (stem παρωτιδ-) : (gland) behind the ear < παρά - pará : behind, and οὖς - ous (stem ὠτ-, ōt-) : ear.

== Causes ==
=== Dehydration ===
Dehydration: This is a common, non-infectious cause of parotitis. It may occur in elderly or after surgery.

=== Infectious ===
Acute bacterial parotitis: is most often caused by a bacterial infection of Staphylococcus aureus but may be caused by any commensal bacteria. Parotitis presents as swelling at the angle of the jaw. Bacterial parotitis presents as a unilateral swelling, where the gland is swollen and tender and usually produces pus at the Stensen's duct. This pus is usually sampled and the bacteria within are identified. Common causative bacteria are Staphylococcus aureus, Streptococcus pyogenes and E. coli. It is associated with poor oral hygiene; oral infections and decreased saliva production. Symptoms include fever, dehydration, chills, fast heartbeat and breathing if the infection is causing sepsis. Medications such as antihistamines and diuretics can be predisposing factors. Treatment is usually antibiotics.

Parotitis as extrapulmonary tuberculosis: The mycobacteria that cause tuberculosis can also cause parotid infection. Parotid swelling can be an uncommon symptom of extrapulmonary tuberculosis (TB outside of the lungs). The usual symptoms are a cough, fever, weight loss, shortness of breath, chest pain, tiredness and chills. This is caused by the bacterium Mycobacterium tuberculosis. TB can also affect the heart, thyroid and adrenal glands but the main site of infection is the lungs. Risk factors are chronic alcohol consumption, diabetes, long term steroid use, HIV infection and kidney failure. Those infected tend to have enlarged, nontender, but moderately painful glands. The diagnosis is made by typical chest radiograph findings, cultures, or histologic diagnosis after the gland has been removed. When diagnosed and treated with antitubercular medications, the gland may return to normal in 1–3 months.

Acute viral parotitis (mumps): The most common viral cause of parotitis is mumps. Routine vaccinations have dropped the incidence of mumps to a very low level. Mumps resolves on its own in about ten days. A viral infection caused by Paramyxovirus, a single-stranded RNA virus. Common symptoms include fever, headache and bilateral or unilateral parotitis (swelling of the parotid gland on one or both sides of the face). The parotid gland is usually swollen and tender. Parotid swelling usually occurs 16–18 days after exposure to the virus. Treatment includes isolation and therefore prevention of spread of the disease and supportive measures such as hot or cold packs. Mumps usually resolves itself and can be prevented by vaccination.

HIV parotitis: Generalized lymphadenopathy has long been associated with HIV, but the localized enlargement of the parotid gland is less well known. HIV-associated salivary gland disease can involve many diseases but often presents as enlargement of the parotid gland and a dry mouth. Causes have not been specifically identified but the most likely are viral opportunists and autoimmune responses. Viruses linked to this can include; hepatitis C, cytomegalovirus, paramyxovirus, influenza A, and adenovirus. Treatment is anti-retroviral therapy.

Disseminated histoplasmosis: During a large urban disseminated histoplasmosis outbreak (est. 100,000 victims) in Indianapolis from 1978 to 1979, manifestations included parotitis.

=== Autoimmune ===
These are also collectively known as chronic punctate parotitis or chronic autoimmune parotitis.

Sjögren's syndrome: Chronic inflammation of the salivary glands may also be an autoimmune disease known as Sjögren's syndrome. The disease most commonly appears in people aged 40–60 years, but it may affect small children. In Sjögren syndrome, the prevalence of parotitis in women versus men is approximately 9:1. The involved parotid gland is enlarged and tender at times. The cause is unknown. The syndrome is often characterized by excessive dryness in the eyes, mouth, nose, vagina, and skin.

Lymphoepithelial lesion of Godwin: Most frequently associated with a circumscribed tumor with the histologic features of Sjögren syndrome. This designation has also fallen out of favour.

=== Blockage ===
Blockage of the main parotid duct, or one of its branches, is often a primary cause of acute parotitis, with further inflammation secondary to bacterial superinfection. The blockage may be from a salivary stone, a mucous plug, or, more rarely, by a tumor, usually benign. Salivary stones (also called sialolithiasis, or salivary duct calculus) are mainly made of calcium, but do not indicate any kind of calcium disorder. Other causes can be duct stricture (narrowing of the duct), infection or injury. Symptoms may include recurrent swelling, pain and aggravation during eating as this is when saliva production is stimulated. Ductal obstruction may cause less saliva flow, which can result in recurrent gland infections.

Stones may be diagnosed via X-ray (with a success rate of about 80%), a computed tomography (CT) scan or medical ultrasonography. Stones may be removed by manipulation in the doctor's office, or, in the worst cases, by surgery. Lithotripsy, also known as "shock wave" treatment, is best known for its use breaking up kidney stones. Lithotripsy can now be used on salivary stones as well. Ultrasound waves break up the stones, and the fragments flush out of the salivary duct.

=== Uncertain ===
Chronic nonspecific parotitis: This term is generally used for patients in whom no definite cause is found. Episodes may last for several days, paralleling the time course of a bacterial or viral illness. Others may experience episodes that last only a few hours from onset to resolution. Some episodes may last for several weeks. Quiescent periods between episodes last for hours, days, or even years.

Recurrent parotitis of childhood: The disease is also known as juvenile recurrent parotitis (JRP). An uncommon syndrome in which recurring episodes clinically resembling mumps. Generally, episodes begin by age 5 years, and the frequency of the episodes generally ceases after the puberty. The duration of attacks averages 3–7 days but may last 2–3 weeks in some individuals. The spectrum varies from mild and infrequent attacks to episodes so frequent that they prevent regular school attendance. Treatment of individual infections may prevent injury to the gland parenchyma. In the past, the disease was treated with aggressive surgical interventions such as Stensen’s duct ligation, superficial or total parotidectomy, and tympanic neurectomy. Nowadays, the disease is managed with sialendoscopic procedure. The sialendoscopy as a relatively safe and minimally invasive technique with a significant impact on the reduction of acute relapse episodes, has immense diagnostic and therapeutic potential in management of juvenile recurrent parotitis.

Sialadenosis (sialosis): In this disorder, both parotid glands may be diffusely enlarged with only modest symptoms. Patients are aged 20–60 years at onset, and the sexes are equally involved. The glands are soft and non-tender. Approximately half of the patients have endocrine disorders such as diabetes, nutritional disorders such as pellagra or kwashiorkor, or have taken drugs such as guanethidine, thioridazine, or isoprenaline.

Sarcoidosis: The lungs, skin, and lymph nodes are most often affected, but the salivary glands are involved in approximately 10% of cases. Bilateral firm, smooth, and non-tender parotid enlargement is classic. Xerostomia occasionally occurs. The Heerfordt-Waldenstrom syndrome consists of sarcoidosis with parotid enlargement, fever, anterior uveitis, and facial nerve palsy.

IgG4-related sialadenitis: This term refers to IgG4-related disease (IgG4-RD) involving any of the major salivary glands, i.e. parotid or submandibular glands. This is often symmetrical and is usually associated with manifestations of IgG4-RD elsewhere in the body. IgG4-related sialadenitis is particularly associated with involvement of one or both of the lacrimal glands (referred to as IgG4-related dacryo-sialadenitis). Mikulicz's disease, now considered to be a subtype of IgG4-related disease, was a term used when (i) any two of the parotid, submandibular and lacrimal glands were persistently and symmetrically enlarged and (ii) other diseases that may mimic this presentation were excluded.

Pneumoparotitis: Air within the ducts of the parotid gland with or without inflammation. The duct orifice normally functions as a valve to prevent air from entering the gland from a pressurized oral cavity. Rarely, an incompetent valve allows insufflation of air into the duct system. Pneumoparotitis most commonly occurs in wind instrument players, glass blowers, and scuba divers.

Several lymph nodes reside within the parotid gland as a superficial and deep group of nodes. These nodes may be involved with any process that affects lymph nodes, including bacterial, fungal, viral, and neoplastic processes. Rarely, drugs such as iodides, phenylbutazone, thiouracil, isoproterenol, heavy metals, sulfisoxazole, and phenothiazines cause parotid swelling.

Associated with Bulimia: Parotid gland swelling is a common feature of self-induced vomiting. This swelling usually develops 3–4 days after the stopping of chronic excessive self-induced vomiting. The swelling is bilateral, with little tenderness. Causes are not well understood. Ideal treatment should be preventative and can involve medication that increases saliva production (sialagogues), anti-inflammatory medication and the application of hot packs. Occasionally pilocarpine can be used to help resolve the swelling.

=== Masseteric hypertrophy ===
Masseteric hypertrophy (enlargement of the masseter muscle's volume) can present as facial swelling in the parotid gland area and may be confused with 'true' parotid gland swelling. The specific cause of masseteric hypertrophy is still unclear, but it may be related to tooth grinding or malocclusion. Treatment options can include surgical removal of some of the muscle and botulinum toxin type A injections.

== Diagnosis ==
Serum and urinary amylase rise during the first week of parotitis.

== Treatment ==
Treatment is based on lab investigation report.
