= Salivary duct stricture =

Medical condition

Salivary duct stricture (also termed salivary duct stenosis) is narrowing of the duct of a major salivary gland.

== Signs and symptoms ==
Strictures are the second most common cause of chronic obstructive sialadenitis, after salivary stones. In line with this, strictures may give rise to the "meal time syndrome", where there is pain and swelling of the involved salivary gland upon salivary stimulation with the sight, smell and taste of food. In other cases, there is irregular and intermittent pain and swelling of the gland which is not related to meal times. Typically the swelling is present upon waking or occurs before the first meal of the day. After several hours, the swelling goes down suddenly with a rush of foul tasting saliva. Strictures are more common in the parotid duct system compared to the submandibular duct system.

== Causes ==
Chronic inflammation of the duct system (sialodochitis) may cause some segments of the duct to narrow due to fibrosis, and others to dilate.

Saliva stagnates and forms a mucus plug behind the stricture during sleep when the salivary output of the parotid is reduced. Then, when salivary secretion is stimulated, the mucus plug becomes stuck in the stricture. The backlog of saliva behind the blockage causes the swelling, and the increased pressure inside the gland causes the pain. When the mucus plug is dislodged, the built up saliva is released and the swelling subsides.

== Diagnosis ==
Strictures tend to be diagnosed based on difficulty with insertion and manipulation during sialendoscopy, or by sialography or ultrasound.

== Treatment ==
Treatment is by endoscopic dilation, or failing this, surgery.

== Epidemiology ==
In one report, about 20% of individuals with mealtime syndrome had strictures upon sialography. For unknown reasons, strictures seem to be more common in females.
