= Pneumoparotitis =

Medical condition

Pneumoparotitis (also termed pneumosialadenitis wind parotitis, surgical mumps, or anaesthesia mumps), is a rare cause of parotid gland swelling which occurs when air is forced through the parotid (Stensen) duct resulting in inflation of the duct.

== Signs and symptoms ==
The size of the swelling is variable, but it is soft and can occur on one side or both sides. It is typically non tender, although sometimes there may be pain. It usually resolves over minutes to hours, however occasionally this may take days. The condition can be transient or recurrent.

== Causes ==
The condition is caused by raised air pressure in the mouth.

== Diagnosis and management ==
Pneumoparotitis is often misdiagnosed and incorrectly managed. The diagnosis is based mainly on the history. Crepitus may be elicited on palpation of the parotid swelling, and massaging the gland may give rise to frothy saliva or air bubbles from the parotid papilla. Further investigations are not typically required, however sialography, ultrasound and computed tomography may all show air in the parotid gland and duct.

Management is simply by avoidance of the activity causing raised intraoral pressure which is triggering this rare condition.

== Prognosis ==
Recurrent pneumoparotitis may predispose to sialectasis, recurrent parotitis, and subcutaneous emphysema of the face and neck, and mediastinum, and potentially pneumothorax.

== Epidemiology ==
The condition is rare. It is more likely to occur in persons who regularly have raised pressure in the mouth, for example wind instrument players, and balloon and glass-blowers. Cases have also been reported with bicycle tyre inflation, whistling, nose blowing, cough and valsalva manoeuvre to clear the ears. It can be an iatrogenic effect of dental treatment, spirometry, and positive pressure ventilation. Apart from these factors, the condition mainly occurs in adolescents, often self-inflicted due to psychological issues.
