= Sialadenitis =

Inflammation of the salivary glands

Sialadenitis (Sialoadenitis)
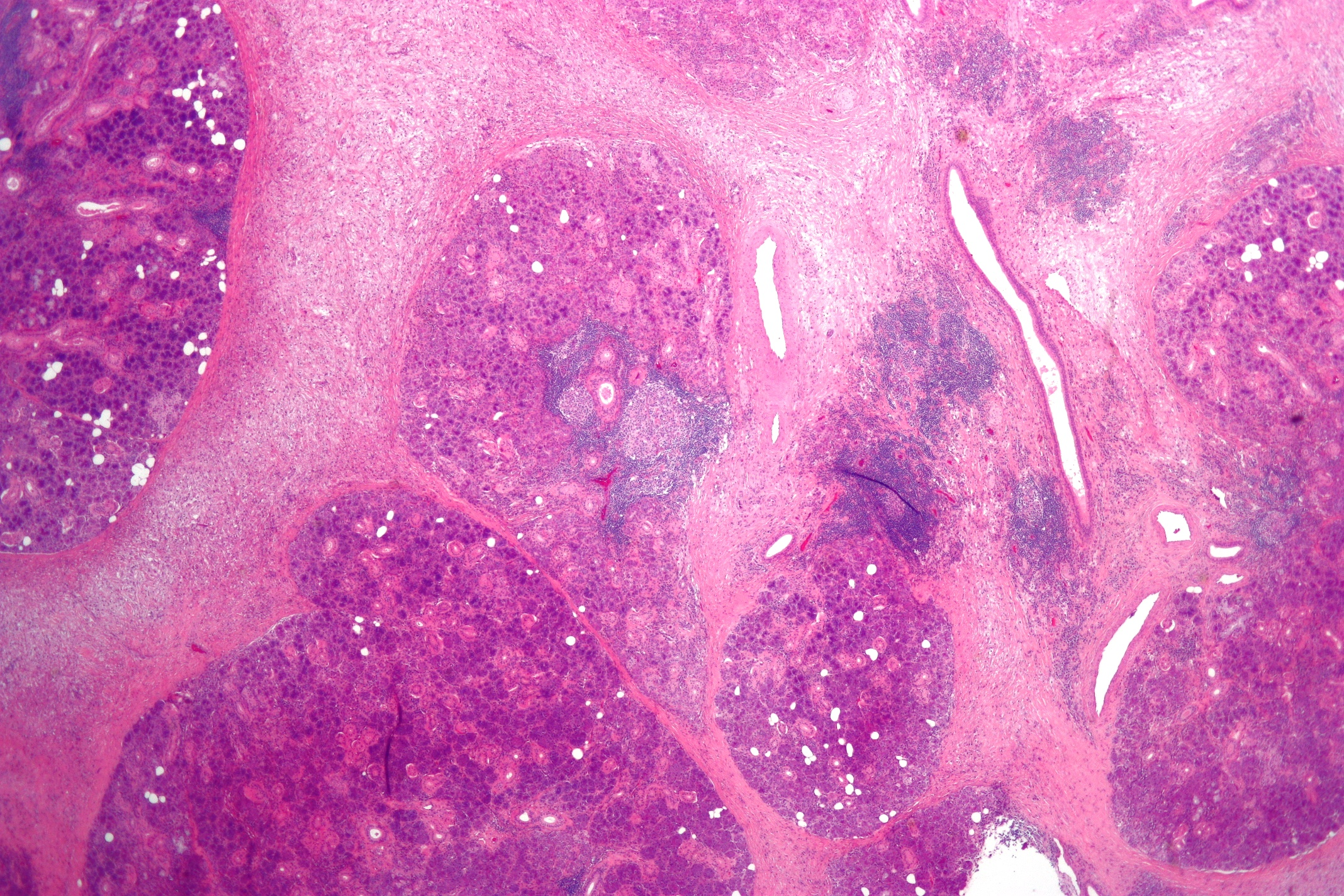
- Micrograph showing chronic sialadenitis. H&E stain.
- Specialty: Otorhinolaryngology

Sialadenitis (sialoadenitis) is inflammation of salivary glands, usually the major ones, the most common being the parotid gland, followed by submandibular and sublingual glands. It should not be confused with sialadenosis (sialosis) which is a non-inflammatory enlargement of the major salivary glands.

Sialadenitis can be further classed as acute or chronic. Acute sialadenitis is an acute inflammation of a salivary gland which may present itself as a red, painful swelling that is tender to touch. Chronic sialadenitis is typically less painful but presents as recurrent swellings, usually after meals, without redness.

Causes of sialadenitis are varied, including bacterial (most commonly Staphylococcus aureus), viral and autoimmune conditions.

== Types ==
=== Acute ===
Predisposing factors

- sialolithiasis
- decreased flow (dehydration, post-operative, drugs)
- poor oral hygiene
- exacerbation of low grade chronic sialoadenitis

Clinical features

- painful swelling
- reddened skin
- edema of the cheek, periorbital region and neck
- low-grade fever
- malaise
- raised ESR, CRP, leucocytosis
- purulent exudate from duct punctum

=== Chronic ===
Clinical features

- unilateral
- mild pain / swelling
- common after meals
- duct orifice is reddened and flow decreases
- may or may not have visible/palpable stone.
- Parotid gland
  - recurrent painful swellings
- Submandibular gland
  - usually secondary to sialolithiasis or stricture

== Signs and symptoms ==
Sialadenitis is swelling and inflammation of the parotid, submandibular, or sublingual major salivary glands. It may be acute or chronic, infective or autoimmune.

=== Acute ===
- Acute sialadenitis secondary to obstruction (sialolithiasis) is characterised by increasingly, painful swelling of 24–72 hours, purulent discharge and systemic manifestations.

=== Chronic ===
- Chronic sialadenitis causes intermittent, recurrent periods of tender swellings. Chronic sclerosing sialadenitis is commonly unilateral and can mimic a tumour.

=== Autoimmune ===
- Autoimmune sialadenitis (i.e Sjögren's syndrome) causes unilateral or bilateral painless swellings unless there is a secondary infection.

=== Infection ===
- The most common salivary gland infection is mumps. It is characterised by bilateral swelling of the parotid glands; however, other major salivary glands may also be affected in around 10% of cases. The swelling persists for about a week, along with low-grade fever and general malaise.
- Recurrent parotitis of childhood is characterised by periods of pain and swelling in the parotid gland accompanied by a fever.

=== Complications ===
Complication	Timeframe	Likelihood
Abscess Infection may spread along the fascial planes of the neck causing a potentially serious complication. Seldom this can affect the spaces in the floor of the mouth and can result in Ludwig angina.	Short term	Medium
Dental decay Hypofunction of the salivary gland will reduce saliva production causing decreased protection against acid erosion and increased risk of dental decay.	Long term	High
Postparotidectomy complications (facial deformity or facial nerve palsy) Temporary facial nerve palsy occurs in around one third to two thirds of patients following superficial parotidectomy. Cosmetic deformity is relatively minor, although symptoms may recur in up to 11-13%, of these not all require further treatment. The occurrence of recurrent symptoms is lower (4%) for subtotal parotidectomy. The choice of the surgical procedure is determined by the extent of the disease and the patient’s preference. The pattern of facial weakness is likely to include one or more branches of the nerve and is likely to be panfacial due to the widespread fibrosis within the gland. Normally complete recovery occurs within 3 to 6 months with permanent palsy occurring in <1%.The prevalence of seroma, haematoma or significant infection should be less than 5%.	Variable	Low

== Causes ==
Sialadenitis can be caused by cancer, autoimmune conditions, viral and bacterial infections, idiopathic causes or stones formed mainly from calculus. It was thought that morphological characteristics of the salivary ducts could also be a contributing factor, as stagnation of saliva due to these could perhaps cause an increased incidence of sialadenitis. However, one study found no statistically significant difference between the length of ducts or the angles they incorporate within them and the likelihood of developing sialadenitis, although this study only had a small sample size of 106. The study also confirmed that age, gender, side of face and degree of sialadenitis had no impact on the length of the ducts or the angles formed within the ducts.

Viral pathogens more commonly cause sialadenitis in comparison to bacterial pathogens. Mumps is the most common virus that affects the parotid and submandibular glands, with the parotid gland affected most often out of these two. Other viruses that have been shown to cause sialadenitis in both these glands include HIV, coxsackie, and parainfluenza. Classically, HIV parotitis is either asymptomatic or a non-painful swelling, which is not characteristic of sialadenitis. Some common bacterial causes are S. aureus, S. pyogenes, viridans streptococci and H. influenzae.

Autoimmune conditions that can cause sialadenitis include Sjögren's syndrome, sarcoidosis, and granulomatosis with polyangiitis. Sjögren's syndrome and sarcoidosis are the most common causes of chronic sialadenitis and are often closely associated with it, and in many cases are believed to be the primary cause, although often with other contributing factors present also. One well known form of sarcoidosis is known as Heerfordt's syndrome which is characterized by facial nerve palsy, enlargement of the parotid and anterior uveitis. One study came to the conclusion that the presence of salivary calculi is the main indicator for the removal of the submandibular gland in patients where neoplasia is absent. This was because 82% of glands removed in an ENT department in Stockholm were found to have salivary calculi within them and all of these cases but one had chronic sialadenitis. A mucous retention cyst was found in one patient, but this was not considered to have contributed to the sialadenitis in this case.

The duration of the sialadenitis was found to be closely linked to atrophy, fibrosis and the degree of the inflammation in another study, which looked primarily at microliths found in the ducts and glands. Liths were also found to be related to the duration that the individual had symptoms of sialadenitis, whereas microliths were found in normal glands and varied with age. Microliths could possibly form reservoirs, thus allowing infection to ascend further towards the glands but this could not be confirmed due to the liths and microliths being distinct in this study. However, many glands did show only very minimal variations, which could allow the opportunity for more conservative treatment instead of the surgical removal of the affected gland in the future.

== Histopathology ==
The initial stage of acute bacterial sialadenitis involves the accumulation of bacteria, neutrophils and inspissated fluid in lumen of ductal structures. Damage to ductal epithelium results in sialodochitis (periductal inflammation), accumulation of neutrophils in glandular stroma, followed by acini necrosis with microabscesses formation. Recurrent episodes result in the chronic stage, which involves the establishment of periductal lymph follicles and further destruction of salivary acini.

=== Infective sialadenitis ===
Generally, in acute bacterial and viral sialadenitis cases, the lobular architecture of the gland is maintained or may be slightly expanded. Areas of liquefaction, indicating presence of abscess, may also be seen microscopically.

In acute bacterial sialadenitis, acinar destruction with interstitial neutrophil infiltrates is observed. Small abscesses with necrosis are common.

In viral sialadenitis, vacuolar changes are seen in the acini with lymphocytic and monocytic infiltrate found in the interstitium.

Cytomegalovirus (CMV) sialadenitis may show no gross symptoms.

Chronic sialadenitis (also known as lymphoepithelial sialadenitis [LESA]) presents with 50% of which are monoclonal by PCR while mucosa-associated lymphoid tissue (MALT) lymphoma has ducts surrounded by broad coronas of monocytoid cells, infiltration of interfollicular region by monocytoid cells or atypical plasma cells containing Dutcher bodies, monoclonality by immunohistochemistry or flow cytometry, and monocytoid infiltrates in regional lymph nodes.

Histologically, chronic sialadenitis can appear from unremarkable to a firm tan with expansion or atrophy of the lobular structure depending on the degree of inflammation and chronicity. Salivary stones (sialolith) may be evident with cystic dilation of the salivary ducts and periductal fibrosis. Mucus extravasation may also be observed.

Common observations of chronic sialadenitis include chronic inflammatory infiltrate (lymphocytes, plasma cells and macrophages), fibrosis, acinar atrophy, and mucous cell metaplasia of the ductal system is observed.

In sialoithiasis, concomitant squamous metaplasia may be observed in the salivary ducts with dark calcific stone fragments.

=== Chronic sialadenitis ===
Chronic sclerosing sialadenitis has various degrees of inflammation that can include focal lymphocytic sialadenitis to widespread salivary gland cirrhosis with obliteration of acini. This can be a result of obstruction of salivary ducts by microliths (due to associated intercurrent infections), or a result of immune reaction with the formation of secondary lymph follicles. Chronic sclerosing sialadenitis is characterised by presence of three major criteria of dense lymphoplasmacytic infiltrate, storiform pattern of fibrosis and obliterative phlebitis. Minor criteria include phlebitis without obliteration of the lumen and increased numbers of eosinophils. There are two features relatively inconsistent with diagnosis of IgG4-related disease which are the presence of epithelioid cell granulomas and a prominent neutrophilic infiltrate.

Sclerosing polycystic sialadenitis histologically resembles sclerosing adenosis/fibrocystic change of breast tissue. It composes of acini and ductal elements embedded in dense sclerotic stroma, and has a characteristic finding of large acinar cells present with abundant eosinophilic cytoplasmic granules. In addition, it may also present ductal epithelial proliferation which could range from hyperplasia, atypia to DCIS-like. Its stroma may show focal adipose tissue with myxoid change and variable radial scar. At present, there are immunohistochemical studies of limited value only. It is cytologically difficult to diagnose this type of sialadenitis due to the rarity of this condition and the presence of variable cell types in a cystic background.

In autoimmune sialadenitis, activation of T and B cells that infiltrate the interstitium occurs due to a response to an unidentified antigen present in the salivary gland parenchyma. This response then results in acini destruction and the formation of epimyoepithelial islands.

=== Autoimmune sialadenitis ===
Most histological appearance of autoimmune sialadenitis is similar to that of myoepithelial sialadenitis. In general, a diffuse to multinodular expansion is observed in myoepithelial sialadenitis. A distinguishing feature is the presence of epithelial-myoepithelial islands infiltrated by lymphocytes. Germinal centers may form with the progression of lymphoid infiltrate resulting in acinar atrophy. Proliferation of ductal epithelium-myoepithelium arises causing the obliteration of ductal lumina causing the formation of the epithelial-myoepithelial islands.

Granulomatosis with polyangiitis may have areas of liquefaction necrosis caused by vasculitis. A triad of vasculitis, necrosis and granulomatous inflammation may be observed.

In secondary Sjögren’s syndrome, periglandular fibrosis with the absence of inflammation may also be observed in addition to that of myoepithelial sialadenitis from the progressive systemic sclerosis.

Sarcoid has tight epithelioid granulomas and lymphoid infiltrate.

Chronic sclerosing sialadenitis has periductal fibrosis with a dense lymphoplasmacytic infiltrate with lymphoid follicles. Eosinophils may be seen.

== Diagnosis ==
According to the British Medical Journal (The BMJ) Best Practice on sialadenitis, there are multiple factors to consider during the diagnosis of sialadenitis, including history, presenting signs and symptoms, followed by appropriate investigations in relation to the presenting case. Other factors to also consider include the type of gland affected as well as underlying conditions such as an autoimmune disease or ductal stones.

=== Acute bacterial sialadenitis ===
May present with a history of recent surgical intervention or use of medications such as antihistamines, antidepressants, or anticholinergic agents. These medications may lead to objective hypofunction or subjective feeling of a dry mouth without hypofunction. There may also be a history of decrease in salivary volume secondary to a systemic disease.

A unilateral or bilateral painful swelling of the parotid or submandibular regions may be present upon a physical examination. This could be accompanied by an external displacement of the earlobe usually adjacent to an inflamed parotid gland. Pus suppuration from major salivary gland duct openings may occur spontaneously or after manipulation of the affected gland. Mandibular trismus is a rare finding but may be present with larger swellings. Dysphagia may also be present in some cases. Fever may also be noted, whilst spiking temperatures may be suggestive of an abscess formation.

=== Chronic recurrent sialadenitis ===
The occurrence of chronic recurrent episodes may be due to underlying Sjögren's syndrome or ductal abnormalities. Prodrome of tingling in the gland preceding pain and swelling may be reported in such cases.

=== Chronic sclerosing sialadenitis ===
Chronic sclerosing sialadenitis typically presents unilaterally in submandibular gland that cannot be differentiated clinically from a neoplasm, with pain an inconsistent finding.

=== Obstructive sialadenitis ===
Formation of stones in glandular ducts (sialoliths) can result in the development of obstructive sialadenitis. There may be a history of abrupt episodic swelling of the parotid or submandibular gland which is usually painful. These episodes typically occur around meal times, lasting 2–3 hours, and gradually subside.

=== Autoimmune sialadenitis ===
Characterised by persistent, asymptomatic bilateral swelling of parotid glands, and may represent as a manifestation of more widespread systemic disease. Dry eyes and dry mouth are commonly present and may be indicative of concomitant connective tissue disease (e.g. systemic lupus erythematosus [SLE], rheumatoid arthritis [RA], or scleroderma). Oral candidiasis may also be present.

Common key diagnostic factors

1. Fever – may present with an acute infective sialadenitis or autoimmune aetiology suggestive of an infection or inflammation.

2. Pain and dysphagia (i.e. difficulty swallowing) – usually unilateral affecting the parotid or submandibular regions, with worse pain during eating and swallowing.

3. Facial swelling – usually unilaterally and affecting parotid region, under the tongue, or below the jaw. May have acute onset and may have a history of repeated episodes.

4. Recurrent painful swellings – indicative of chronic recurrent sialadenitis, may have similar signs and symptoms to an acute episode.

5. Pus exudation from salivary gland openings – indicative of bacterial infection, may occur on manipulation of the affected gland or spontaneously.

Other common diagnostic factors

1. Episodic swelling during meal times – may present as an acute salivary gland swelling without visible salivary flow from ductal openings, while palpation of affected glad may reveal an indurated salivary gland and presence of a sialolith.

2. Use of xerostomic medications – these medications will result in a decreased salivary flow rate which can predispose to infections of glands. Examples of medications that may contribute to this include antihistamines, antidepressants, and anticholinergic agents.

3. Recent surgical intervention under general anaesthetic – this could predispose to sialadenitis due to direct effects of anaesthetic agents used and volume depletion from surgery.

4. Dry eyes and mouth – dryness affecting the eyes and oral cavity are key symptoms of Sjögren's syndrome and may be seen in combination with a connective tissue disease such as rheumatoid arthritis, scleroderma, or dermatomyositis.

5. Oral candidiasis – may be present in cases of Sjögren's syndrome or in association with a connective tissue disorder.

Less common key factors

1. Mandibular trismus – restricted mouth opening to its full extent (of approximately 40mm) may be present with large swellings typically due to acute bacterial infection of affected gland.

2. Respiratory distress – this could present in the form of stridor, use or reliance on accessory muscles of respiratory, nasal flaring, or wheeze. These signs may develop if glandular swelling is significant enough, resulting in airway obstruction.

3. Cranial nerve palsy – swelling increases the risk of compression of cranial nerves VII, IX and XII.

Other less common diagnostic factors

1. Connective tissue disorder or Sjögren's syndrome – history of Sjögren's syndrome, or a concomitant connect tissue disorder such as systemic lupus erythematosus, rheumatoid arthritis, or scleroderma.

2. Recurrent painless swellings – indicative of underlying autoimmune aetiology.

3. Displacement of earlobe – may be present when swelling of the parotid gland is present.

4. Prodrome of tingling in the affected gland

5. Swelling on hard palate

==== Diagnostic tests ====
Tests available as part of diagnosing sialadenitis include:

1. Culture and sensitivity testing of exudate from salivary duct. Culturing of purulent discharge is advisable in acute presentations of sialadenitis to allow targeted antibiotic therapy.
2. Full blood count if infection is suspected.
3. Facial radiographs such as dental radiographic views should be taken to exclude an obstructive element due to presence of sialolith or evolving abscess. However, sialoliths with low calcium phosphate content may not be visible.

== Treatment ==
In chronic recurrent sialadenitis or chronic sclerosing sialadenitis, acute attacks are managed with conservative therapies such as hydration, analgesics (mainly NSAIDs), sialogogues to stimulate salivary secretion, and regular, gentle gland massage. If infection is present, appropriate cultures should be obtained, followed by empirical antibiotic therapy initially, for example amoxicillin/clavulanate or clindamycin which cover oral flora.

If attacks occur more than approximately three times per year or are severe, surgical excision of the affected gland should be considered.

== Epidemiology ==
Sialadenitis of the parotid gland accounts for a much larger percentage of hospital admissions than sialadenitis of the submandibular gland. Submandibular sialadenitis has been said to only account for 10% of all cases diagnosed as sialadenitis. Chronic sialadenitis has been classified as a relatively common presentation, whereas bacterial sialadenitis and sclerosing polycystic sialadenitis are defined as rare. Chronic sclerosing sialadenitis has been shown to affect predominantly males who are over the age of 50, with 40% of cases having an allergic disease, such as chronic sinusitis or bronchial asthma.

One study found that 112 patients from England and Wales ranging from 12 to 81 years of age complained of symptoms from their diagnosed sialadenitis, with the group having a mean age of 39 and a standard deviation of 16 years. The study also found that more patients underwent surgery to treat their sialadenitis between the ages of 20 and 69 years but that there were many more patients who complained of symptoms between the ages of 20 and 49, and then went on to be diagnosed with sialadenitis. In each group studied, most patients suffered from sialadenitis in their twenties but there was also found to be a significant number of females whose symptoms started in their thirties and forties. More women reported symptoms that were confirmed to be sialadenitis than men in this study, which may suggest that females are more likely to be affected but more research would need to be done to be sure of this.

A study done on the epidemiology of sialadenitis in the United States of America found that acute suppurative parotitis is responsible for 0.01–0.02% of hospital admissions, with the submandibular gland accounting for 10% of cases of sialadenitis in the major salivary glands in this population. This study found that there was no predilection to any race, sex or age, although it was noted that sialadenitis in general tended to occur in people who are debilitated, dehydrated or older.

Bacterial sialadenitis is uncommon nowadays and is usually associated with sialoliths. A study involving hospitals in the United Kingdom found that the incidence of admissions for sialadenitis is 27.5 per million of the population, with the most common cause being mumps, which causes a viral infection in the salivary gland. Ascending acute bacterial parotitis used to be a common perimortal event but today this is no longer the case due to antibiotics and basic modern care, which means that patients will be much less likely to become dehydrated.

== See also ==
- Sialoendoscopy
