= Sialectasis =

Medical condition

Sialectasis (also termed sialectasia, or siadochiectasis) is cystic dilation of the ducts of salivary glands. It may be caused by salivary duct strictures or stones (sialolithiasis). It can also rarely be congenital.

== See also ==
- Bronchiectasis
