= Salivary duct =

A salivary duct is a duct which brings saliva from a salivary gland to part of the digestive tract. In human anatomy there are:

- Parotid duct
- Submandibular duct
- Major sublingual duct
