= Salivary ducts =

The salivary ducts (a duct of a salivary gland). These include:

- Stensen's duct
- Wharton's duct
- Major sublingual duct
