= Immune-selective anti-inflammatory derivative =

Immune Selective Anti-Inflammatory Derivatives (ImSAIDs) are a class of peptides that have anti-inflammatory properties. ImSAIDs work by altering the activation and migration of inflammatory cells, which are immune cells responsible for amplifying the inflammatory response.

== History ==
The ImSAIDs represent a new category of anti-inflammatory and are unrelated to steroid hormones or non steroidal anti-inflammatories. The ImSAIDs were discovered by scientists evaluating biological properties of the submandibular gland and saliva. Early work in this area demonstrated that the submandibular gland released a host of factors which regulate systemic inflammatory responses and modulate systemic immune and inflammatory reactions. Early work in identifying factors that played a role in the CST-SMG axis lead to the discovery of a seven amino acid peptide, called the submandibular gland peptide-T. SGP-T was demonstrated to have biological activity and thermoregulatory properties related to endotoxin exposure. SGP-T, an isolate of the submandibular gland, demonstrated its immunoregulatory properties and potential role in modulating the cervical sympathetic trunk-submandibular gland (CST-SMG) axis, and subsequently was shown to play an important role in the control of inflammation.

== Mechanisms or ImmunoPharmacology ==
It is now well accepted that the immune, nervous and endocrine systems communicate and interact to control and modulate inflammation and tissue repair. One of the neuroendocrine pathways, when activated, results in the release of immune regulating peptides from the submandibular gland upon neuronal stimulation from sympathetic nerves. This pathway or communication is referred to as the cervical sympathetic trunk-submandibular gland (CST-SMG) axis, a regulatory system that plays a role in the systemic control of inflammation.

Cellular Effects of feG: The cellular effects of the ImSAIDs are characterized in a number of publications. feG and related peptides are known to modulate leukocyte (white blood cells) activity by influencing cell surface receptors to inhibit excessive activation and tissue infiltration. One lead ImSAID, the tripeptide FEG (Phe-Glu-Gly) and its D-isomer feG are known to alter leukocyte adhesion involving actions on αMβ2 integrin, and inhibit the binding of CD16b (FCyRIII) antibody to human neutrophils. One ImSAID, termed feG, has also been shown to decrease circulating neutrophil and eosinophil accumulation, decrease intracellular oxidative activity and reduced the expression of CD49d after antigen exposure.

== Lead Compound ==
One SGP-T derivative is a three amino acid sequence shown to be a potent anti-inflammatory molecule with systemic effects. This three amino acid peptide is phenylalanine-glutamine-glycine (FEG) and its D-isomeric form (feG), have become the foundation for the ImSAID category.
