= Crystallopathy =

Disease caused by accumulation of crystals

Crystallopathy is a harmful state or disease associated with the formation and aggregation of crystals in tissues or cavities, or in other words, a heterogeneous group of diseases caused by intrinsic or environmental microparticles or crystals, promoting tissue inflammation and scarring.

== Composition ==
Crystallopathies can be associated with four main kinds of crystalline structures: liquid non-aggregating crystal solutions, amorphous nano-scale solid particles, crystalline micro-scale solid particles, and polycrystalline larger solid structures. They can be composed of various minerals, metabolites, proteins, and microparticles, including the following:

- Paraproteins
- Amyloid beta peptides
- Amylin
- Transthyretin
- Alpha-synuclein
- Prions
- Uromodulin
- ASC speck complex
- Myoglobin
- Heme
- Misfolded proteins
- Hydroxyapatite
- Calcium phosphate
- Calcium oxalate monohydrate
- Calcium oxalate dihydrate
- Calcium pyrophosphate
- Calcium pyrophosphate dihydrate
- Calcium carbonate
- Aluminium salts
- Monosodium urate
- Magnesium ammonium phosphate (struvite)
- Brushite
- Cholesterol
- Adenine
- Cystine
- Asbestos
- Silica dioxide
- Cotton
- Charcoal
- Smoke particulates
- Air pollutants
- Cosmetics-derived microparticles
- Drug nanoparticles
- Implant-derived particles

== Location ==
In principle, crystal formation can happen anywhere in the body. Well-known places are excretory organs where concentrations get high easily, like in the biliary and urinary tracts, but crystalline structures are also formed in intracellular and extracellular spaces of tissues, like within the arterial wall in atherosclerosis.

For example, mechanical obstruction by mineral stones causes nephrolithiasis, urolithiasis, cholecystolithiasis, choledocholithiasis, docholithiasis, and sialolithiasis, and acute inflammation caused by crystals in joints causes gout and pseudogout.

Renal diseases are also common in crystallopathies, including:

- Acute oxalate nephropathy
- Acute phosphate nephropathy
- Chronic oxalate nephropathy
- Bile cast nephropathy
- Myeloma cast nephropathy
- Renal tubulopathy
- Fibrillary glomerulonephritis
- Immunotactoid glomerulopathy
- Urate nephropathy
- Myoglobin cast nephropathy
- Acute kidney injury
- Chronic kidney disease

== Mechanisms ==
Local supersaturation is a common trigger of crystallization, and when the nucleus of the crystalline structure is formed, crystals can self-perpetuate and cause more crystallization and aggregation. Main mechanisms by which the formed crystals and aggregates cause pathological states and ultimately disease are acute necroinflammation, chronic tissue remodelling, and mechanical obstruction.

Necroinflammation is an autoamplifying process where crystals are toxic to cells (cytotoxicity) and cause cell death (necrosis and regulated cell death) and a local and systemic inflammatory response. Cytotoxicity includes actin depolymerization, free radical and reactive oxygen species synthesis, and autophagy. Crystals can also directly activate inflammation via Mincle receptors, calcium and potassium signalling, calpains, cathepsin beta, proteases, and NLPR3 inflammasomes.

Cells undergo cell death via three main mechanisms: necroptosis via RIPK1, FADD, RIPK3, and MLKL, ferroptosis via GPX4 suppression, system Xc suppression, and NAPDH loss, as well as apoptosis via RIPK1 and caspase 8. These distressed cells then excrete alarmins, proteases, and damage-associated molecular patterns including HMGB1, histones, mitochondrial DNA, demethylated DNA and RNA, ATP, uric acid, and double-stranded DNA, which further activates Toll-like receptors and inflammasomes. Finally, this activates the inflammatory response including the release of pro-inflammatory interleukin 1 alpha, interleukin 1 beta, cytokines, kinins, lipid inflammatory mediators, complement system activation, vasodilation, an increase in endothelial permeability and leukocyte influx, and pain.

Macrophages are key cells that try to remove crystals from tissues by phagocytosis. As part of the inflammatory response, they undergo polarization into a pro-inflammatory state called M1. Macrophages can ingest particles at most a few microns in diameter. If digestion of the crystalline material fails in the lysosomes however, macrophages undergo autophagy, form foam cells and giant cells, and try to do extracellular digestion in a process called frustrated phagocytosis.

Crystals do not always cause acute inflammation but instead lead to chronic tissue remodelling. This process is possible because crystals get shielded from pro-inflammatory processes by compartmentalization (e.g. granuloma formation, fibrosis, and wound-healing) or molecular coating, or because inflammatory responses are suppressed with direct anti-inflammatory signalling (e.g. CLEC12A and NETosis).

Crystals can attach to membranes via annexin II, CD44, and osteopontin.

== Interventions ==
The most straightforward treatment of crystallopathies would be dissolving the crystals. Crystal dissolvents have been under research, for example with cyclodextrin in atherosclerosis. Another approach would be to modify the inflammatory pathways common for crystallopathies with treatments such as IL-1a and IL-1b antagonists, NLRP3-antagonists, or blockers of ferroptosis and necroptosis. For protein-based crystallopathy, pharmacologic chaperones, protein stabilizing small molecules, and protein refolding agents have been under consideration.
