= Sialography =

Radiographic examination of the salivary glands

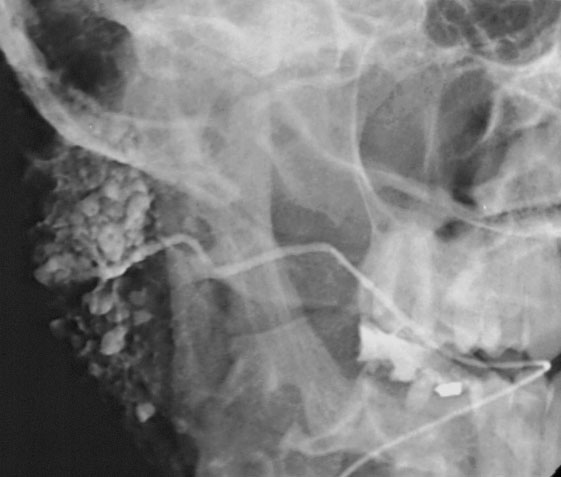
- Sialogram in a patient suspected of Sjögren's syndrome
- MeSH: D012796
- MedlinePlus: 003812

Sialography (also termed radiosialography) is the radiographic examination of the salivary glands. It usually involves the injection of a small amount of contrast medium into the salivary duct of a single gland, followed by routine X-ray projections.

The resulting image is called a sialogram.

Sialography has largely been replaced by sialoendoscopy and cross-sectional imaging, such as CT, MRI and ultrasonography.

== Uses ==
This procedure is indicated when there is recurrent swelling and pain on the face but ultrasound has not revealed any problems. If Sjögren syndrome (also known as Sicca syndrome, an autoimmune disease that affects the lacrimal and salivary glands, causing reduced tears and saliva production) is suspected, this procedure is useful. Besides, when interventional procedure is planned such as stone removal from salivary ducts or dilatation of the strictures in the salivary gland, this procedure is also indicated. However, for those who are pregnant, with allergy to iodinated contrast, and ongoing infection or inflammation of the face, the procedure is contraindicated.

== Procedure ==
Contrast agents are classified into two groups: fat-soluble contrast agents and water-soluble contrast agents. Water-soluble contrast agents can fill the finer elements of the ductal system. Fat-soluble contrast agents are viscous and can cause allergic reactions. These can also cause discomfort to the patients. Fat-soluble contrast agents do not fill finer elements of the duct.

A baseline radiograph (scout film) of the required salivary gland would be taken, the duct is dilated using graded lacrimal probes, a cannula then is inserted in this salivary gland duct's opening in the mouth, then a radio-opaque fluid (contrast medium) is injected in the duct through a small tube.

A series of radiographs would then be taken to determine the flow of the fluid, identify any obstructions and its location, the rate of fluid excretion from the gland.

Usually the radiographs taken are lateral oblique views of the face as orthopantomograms are not useful for the purpose of locating the area due to superimpositions and the way they are taken to put the teeth in the main field.

== Interpretation ==
This study is interpreted by evaluating the morphology of the salivary ducts for obstructions and chronic inflammation. Sialodochitis is a term describing dilation of the ducts caused by repeated inflammatory or infective processes. There is also irregular salivary duct stricture (narrowing) of the duct, which creates an appearance known as "sausage link" pattern on a sialogram. Suggestions of abscesses and autoimmune diseases such as Sjögren syndrome can also be elicited. Sialadenitis is inflammation of the salivary glands, which may cause acinar atrophy and create an appearance known as "pruning of the tree" on a sialogram, where there are less branches visible from the duct system. A space occupying lesion that occurs within or adjacent to a salivary gland can displace the normal anatomy of the gland. This may create an appearance known as "ball in hand" on an sialogram, where the ducts are curved around the mass of the lesion.

== Adverse effects ==
Like any medical imaging utilizing ionizing radiation, there will be a degree of direct ionizing damage and indirect damage from free radicals created during the ionization of water molecules within cells. The risk of causing the development of a malignant tumor is incredibly small, and is weighed against the benefits of the investigation on a case-by-case basis.

Possible complications include:

- Pain on injection,
- Post procedural infection,
- Ductal rupture,
- Extravasation of contrast media,
- Allergic reaction to iodinated contrast media (which may present with urticaria, dyspnoea, and hypotension).
