= Thiouracil =

Thiouracil may refer to:

- 2-Thiouracil
- 4-Thiouracil
