= Submandibular gland =

Human salivary gland

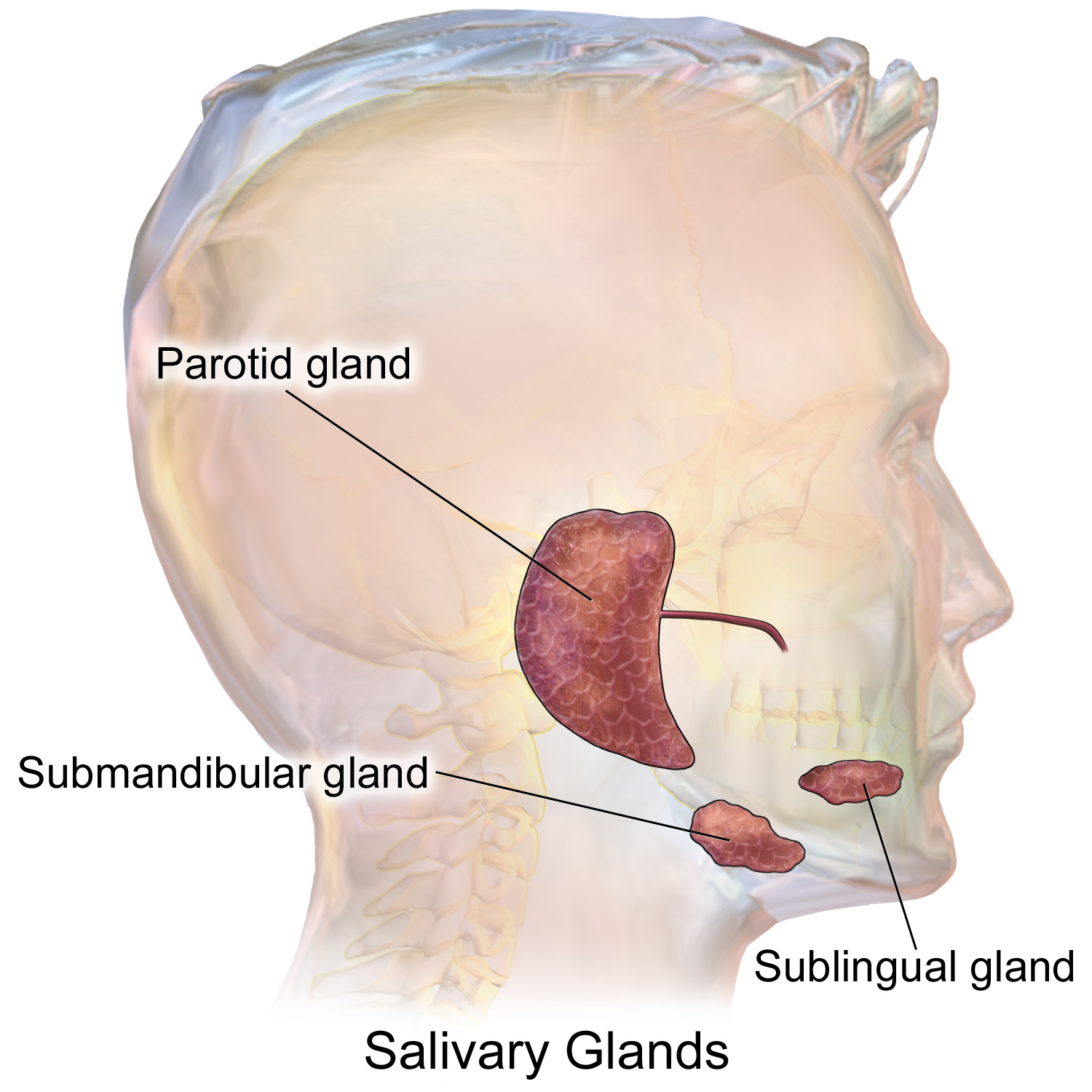
- Salivary glands

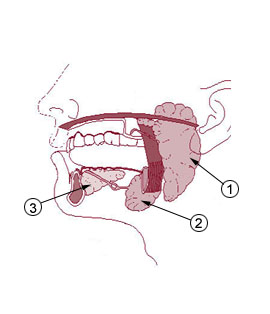
- Salivary glands: 1 – parotid gland, 2 – submandibular gland, 3 – sublingual gland

Details
- Artery: Glandular branches of facial artery
- Nerve: Submandibular ganglion

Identifiers
- Latin: glandula submandibularis
- MeSH: D013363
- TA98: A05.1.02.011
- TA2: 2810
- FMA: 55093

The paired submandibular glands (historically known as submaxillary glands) are major salivary glands located beneath the floor of the mouth. In adult humans, they each weigh about 15 grams and contribute some 60–67% of unstimulated saliva secretion; on stimulation, their contribution decreases in proportion as parotid gland secretion rises to 50%. The average length of the normal adult human submandibular salivary gland is approximately 27 mm, while the average width is approximately 14.3 mm.

== Structure ==
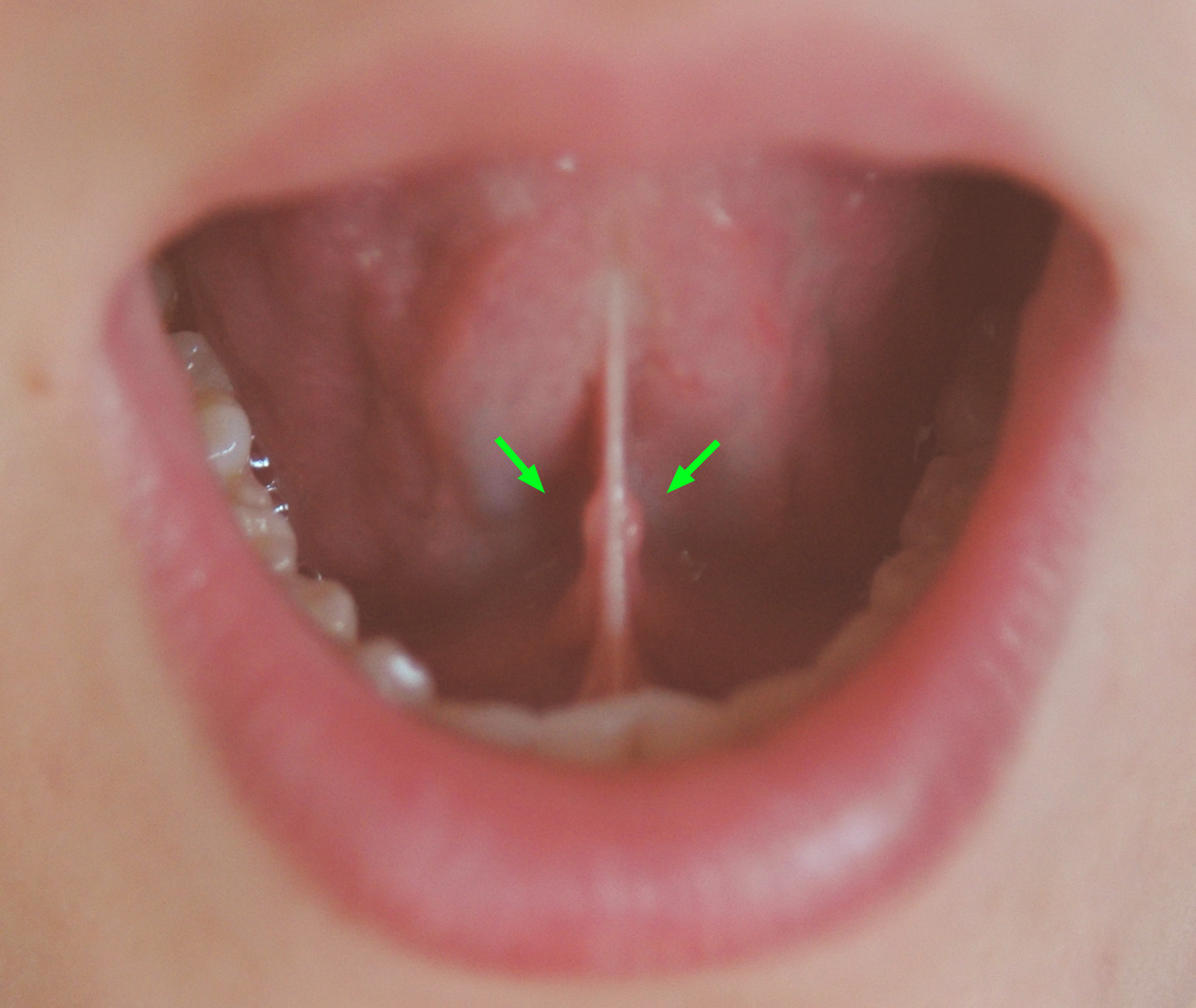
Sublingual caruncles highlighted on either side of the lingual frenulum

Each submandibular gland is divided into a superficial part and a deep part, which are separated by the mylohyoid muscle:

- The superficial part comprises most of the gland and lies inferior and superficial to the mylohyoid muscle.
- The smaller deep part curves around the posterior free border of the mylohyoid muscle and extends into the floor of the mouth.

=== Submandibular duct ===
The submandibular duct, also called Wharton's duct, is approximately 5 cm long. It arises from the deep part of the gland and runs anteriorly through the floor of the mouth. The lingual nerve loops beneath the duct, passing from its lateral to its medial side. The duct opens at the sublingual caruncle on either side of the lingual frenulum.

The gland can be bilaterally palpated inferior and posterior to the body of the mandible by moving inward from the inferior border of the mandible near its angle while the head is tilted forwards.

=== Submandibular gland papilla ===
The terminal part of the submandibular duct is located in the floor of the mouth and opens through the orifice of the submandibular duct papilla. The position of the duct and its 0.5–1.5 mm-wide ostium is invariably symmetric but quite unpredictable; consequently, the submandibular duct papillae can occasionally be challenging to recognize. Based on the macroscopic appearance of the papillae and a sialoendoscopic approach, Aničin et al. described four different types of submandibular gland papillae: types A, B, C, and D.

=== Microanatomy ===
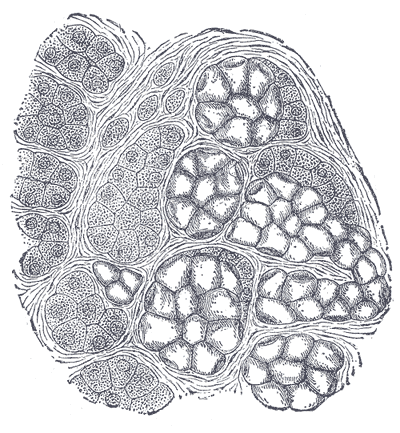
Human submandibular gland. At the right is a group of mucous acini, and at the left is a group of serous acini.

The lobes contain smaller lobules, which contain adenomeres, the secretory units of the gland. Each adenomere contains one or more acini, or alveoli, which are small clusters of cells that secrete their products into a duct.

The submandibular gland is a mixed, branched tubuloacinar gland containing both serous and mucous secretory cells. Serous acini predominate, while mucous acini account for a smaller proportion of the secretory units.

Serous cells produce a watery, protein-rich secretion containing enzymes such as salivary amylase. Mucous cells produce mucins that lubricate the oral cavity and food bolus. Some mucous acini may appear capped by crescent-shaped serous demilunes.

The primary acinar secretion is modified as it passes through the duct system. The gland has relatively short intercalated ducts and well-developed striated ducts, which modify the electrolyte composition of saliva.

=== Blood supply ===
The gland receives its arterial blood supply from branches of the facial and lingual arteries. It is supplied particularly by the submental and sublingual arteries and is drained by the facial and lingual veins.

=== Lymphatic drainage ===
The lymphatic vessels of the submandibular gland first drain into the submandibular lymph nodes and subsequently into the upper deep cervical lymph nodes, including the jugulodigastric nodes.

=== Nerve supply ===
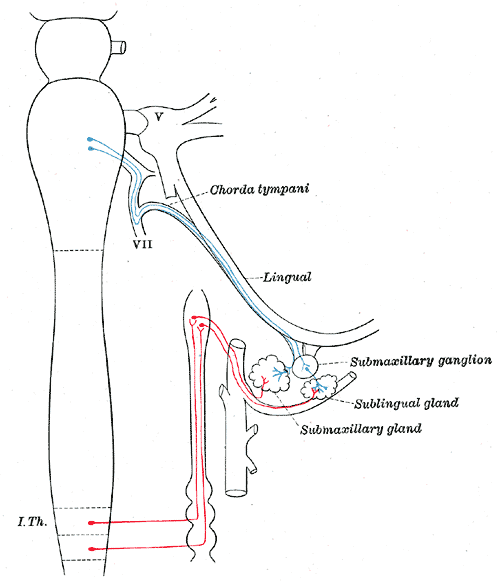
Parasympathetic and sympathetic connections of the submaxillary and superior cervical ganglia.

The secretion of the submandibular gland is regulated by both the parasympathetic and sympathetic nervous systems.

- Parasympathetic innervation originates in the superior salivatory nucleus. Preganglionic fibres travel through the facial nerve and chorda tympani, join the lingual nerve, and synapse in the submandibular ganglion. Postganglionic fibres then supply the gland. Parasympathetic stimulation promotes a relatively large volume of watery saliva.
- Sympathetic innervation originates from the superior cervical ganglion. Postganglionic fibres reach the gland through periarterial plexuses associated with branches of the external carotid artery. Sympathetic stimulation promotes vasoconstriction and increases the protein content of the secretion.

=== Relations ===
The submandibular gland occupies most of the submandibular triangle and rests partly within the submandibular fossa on the medial surface of the mandible. Its larger superficial part lies inferior to the mylohyoid muscle, while its smaller deep part curves around the posterior border of the mylohyoid and enters the floor of the mouth.

The facial artery has a close relationship with the posterior and deep surfaces of the gland, while the facial vein generally passes superficially. The marginal mandibular branch of the facial nerve lies superficial to the facial vessels and is an important surgical relation.

The lingual nerve and submandibular ganglion are closely related to the deep part of the gland and the submandibular duct. The lingual nerve passes beneath the duct as it travels from the lateral to the medial side. The hypoglossal nerve lies deep and inferior to the duct and gland.

=== Development ===
The submandibular salivary glands develop later than the parotid glands and appear late in the sixth week of prenatal development. They develop bilaterally from epithelial buds in the sulcus surrounding the sublingual folds on the floor of the primitive mouth. Solid cords branch from the buds and grow posteriorly, lateral to the developing tongue.

The cords of the submandibular gland later branch further and become canalized to form the ductal system. The submandibular gland acini develop from the rounded terminal ends of the cords at approximately 12 weeks, and secretory activity through the submandibular duct begins at approximately 16 weeks.

Growth of the submandibular gland continues after birth through the formation of additional acini. Lateral to both sides of the tongue, a linear groove develops and closes to form the submandibular duct.

== Function ==
The submandibular glands are one of the three paired major salivary glands. The other two are the parotid and sublingual glands.

The submandibular glands produce most of the saliva secreted under unstimulated resting conditions. During stimulation, such as chewing, the relative contribution of the parotid glands increases.

Their mixed serous and mucous secretion lubricates the oral mucosa and food bolus, assists mastication, swallowing and speech, and begins starch digestion through the activity of salivary amylase.

Saliva also contributes to oral protection. Mucins help lubricate oral tissues, bicarbonate helps buffer acids, and components including immunoglobulins, lysozyme and lactoferrin contribute to antimicrobial defence.

== Clinical significance ==
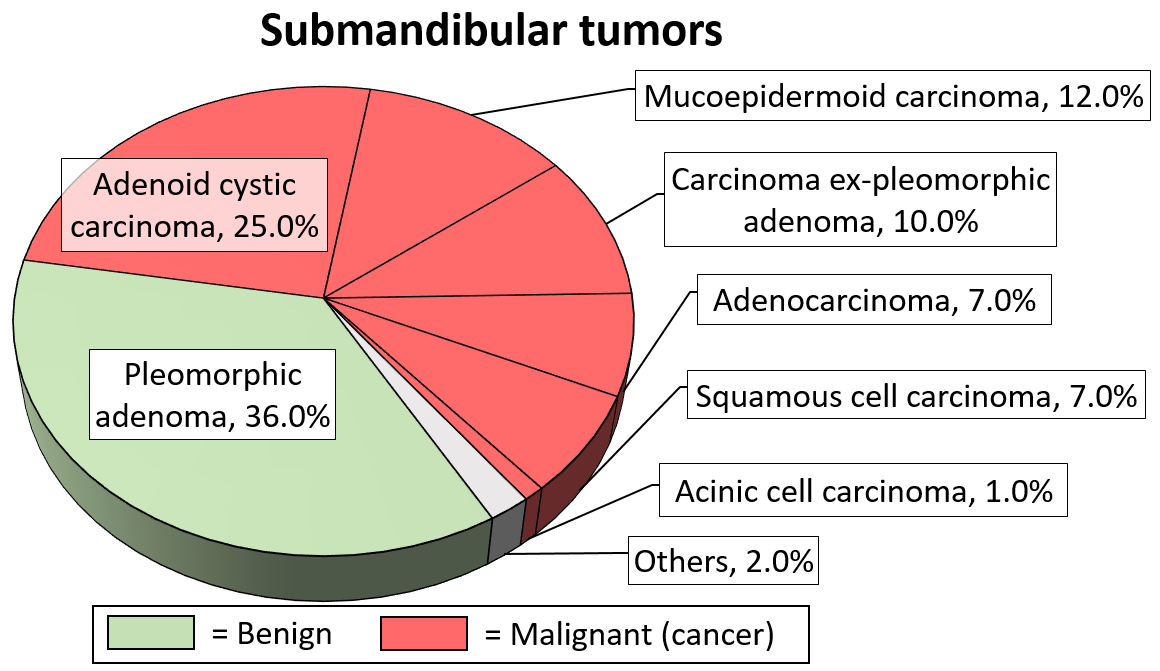
Relative incidence of submandibular tumors. Diagrams by Mikael Häggström.

The submandibular gland is commonly affected by salivary duct calculi, also known as sialoliths. Its susceptibility has been associated with the long, upward course of the submandibular duct and the character of its mixed secretion.

Obstruction of the duct may cause recurrent pain and swelling, particularly during meals. Persistent obstruction can promote salivary stasis, inflammation and secondary bacterial sialadenitis.

Small or accessible calculi may be treated using gland massage, duct dilation, transoral removal, lithotripsy or sialoendoscopy. Recurrent obstruction, chronic sialadenitis or neoplasia may require excision of the gland.

Structures at risk during submandibular gland surgery include the marginal mandibular branch of the facial nerve, the lingual nerve, the hypoglossal nerve, and the facial artery and vein.

Benign and malignant tumours can also develop in the submandibular gland.

== Additional images ==
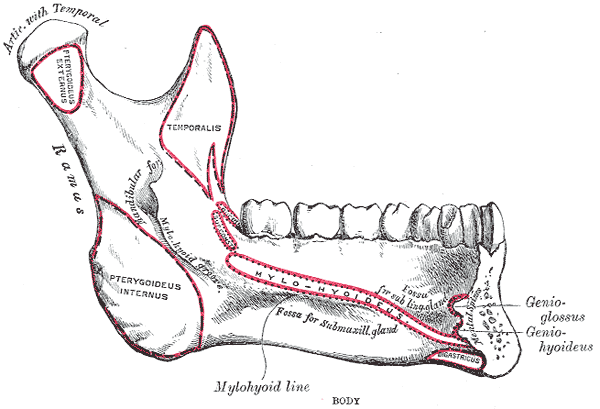
Mandible, inner surface, side view

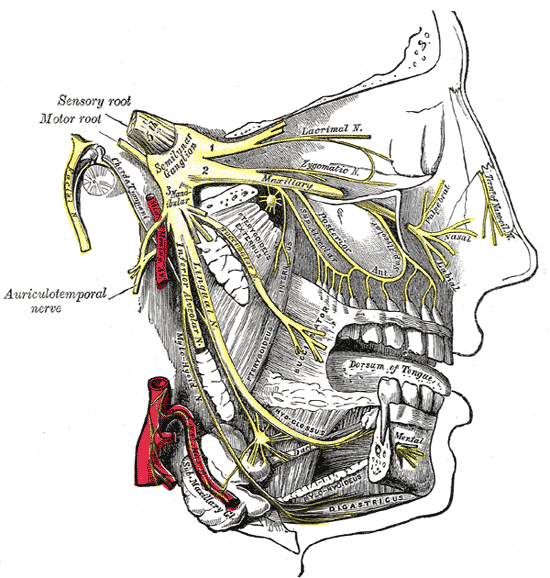
Distribution of the maxillary and mandibular nerves and the submaxillary ganglion

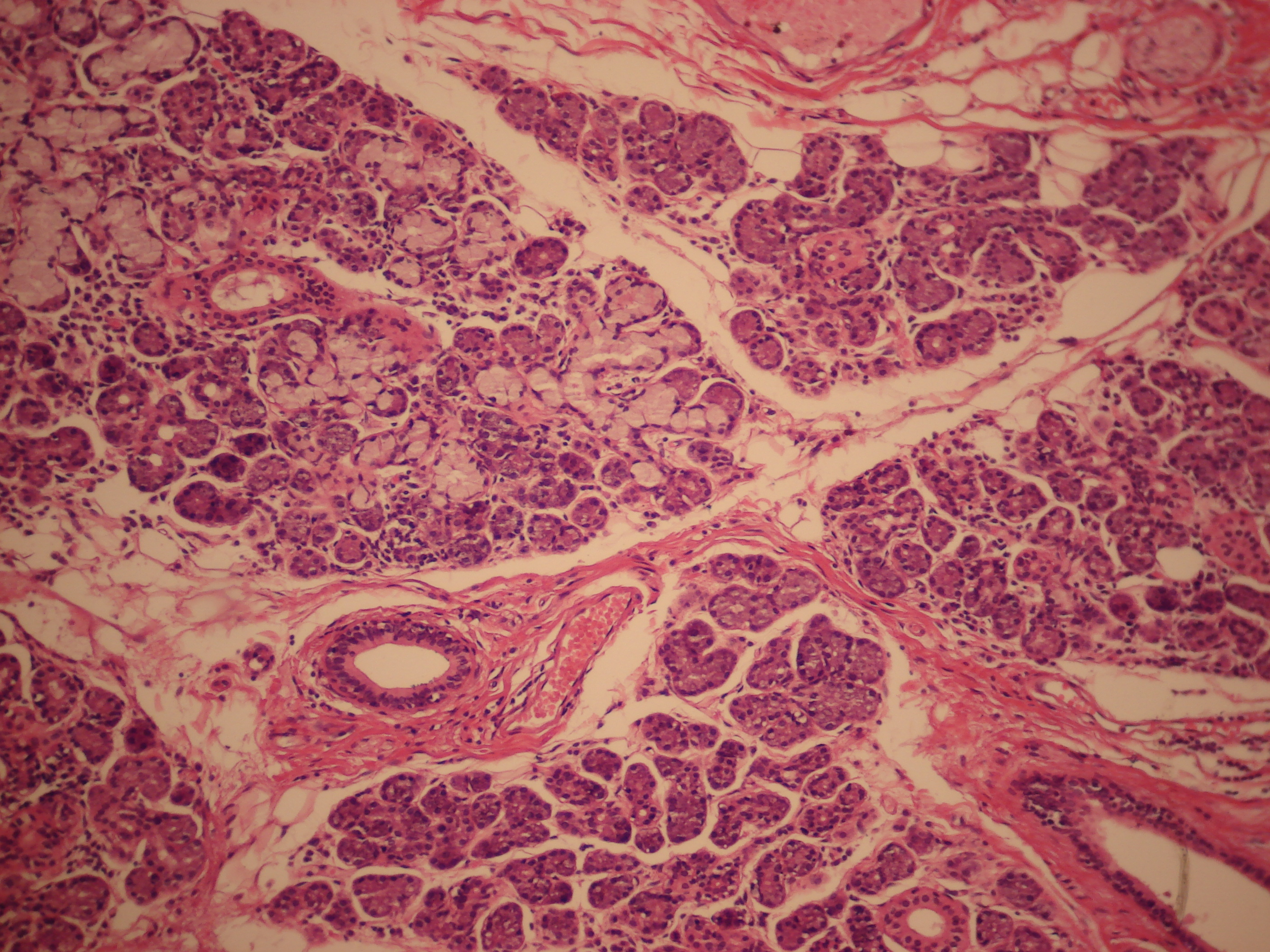
Mucous cells are identifiable by their pale cytoplasm, while serous cells have a basophilic appearance

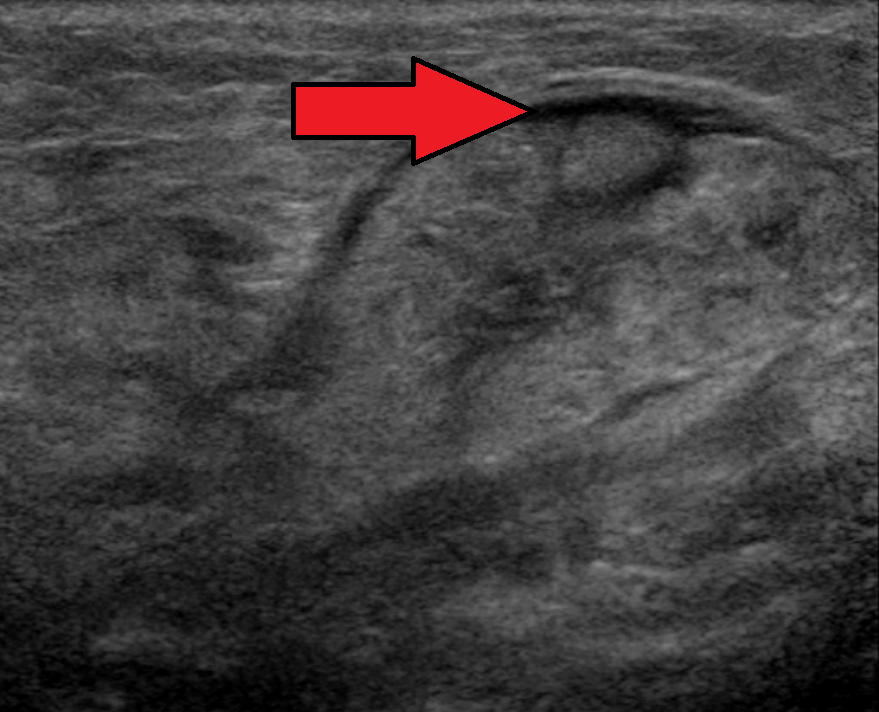
Submandibular gland inflammation as seen on ultrasound

=== Dissection images ===
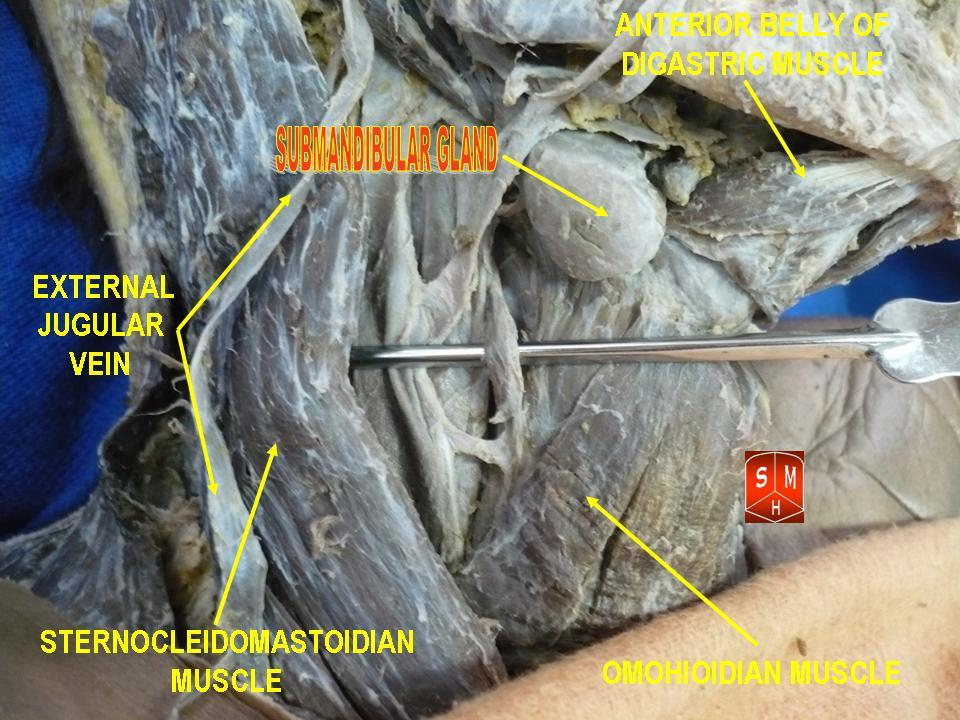
Submandibular gland

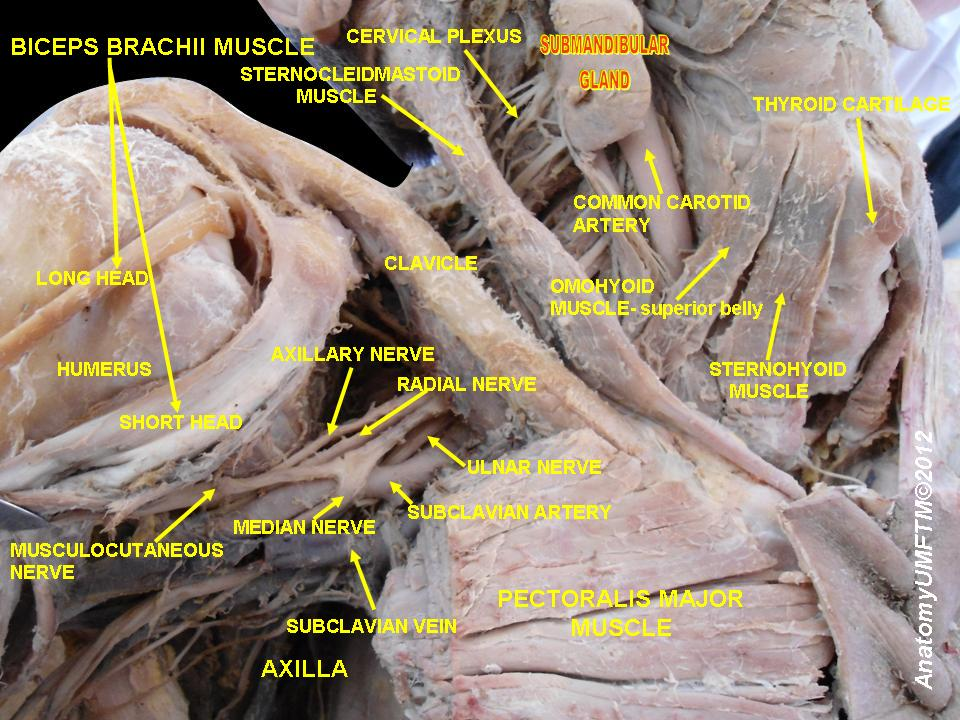
Submandibular gland

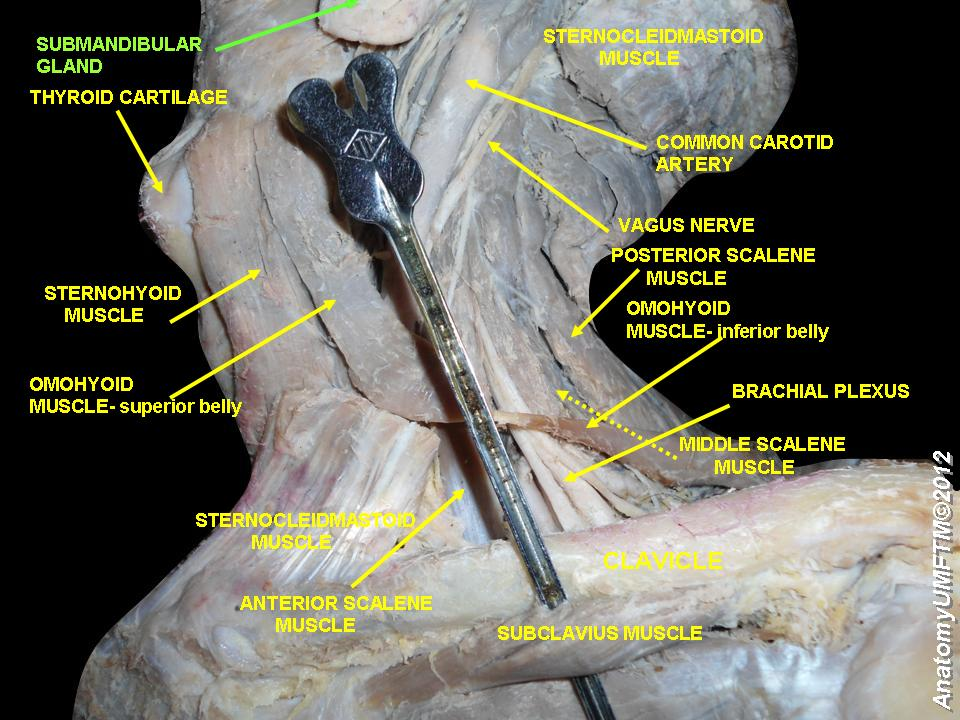
Submandibular gland, lateral view

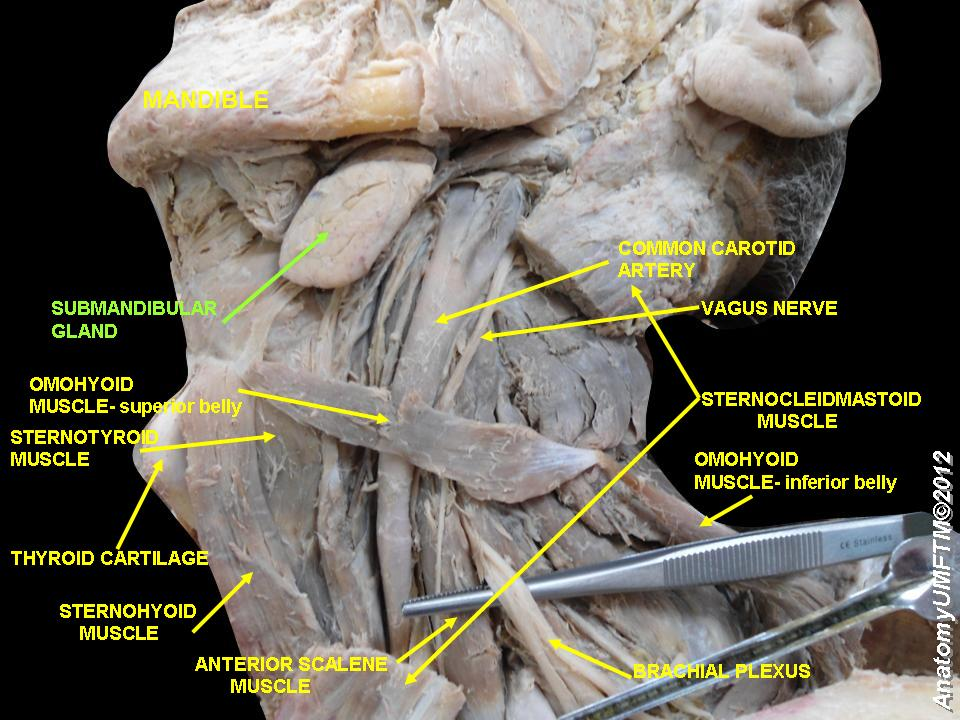
Submandibular gland

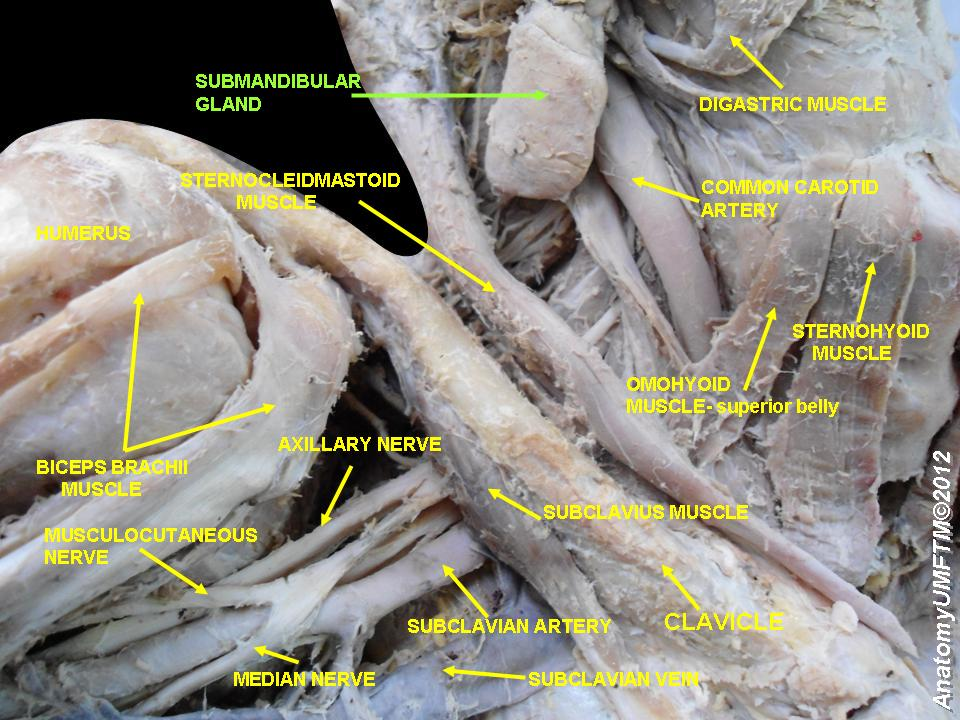
Submandibular gland, right view

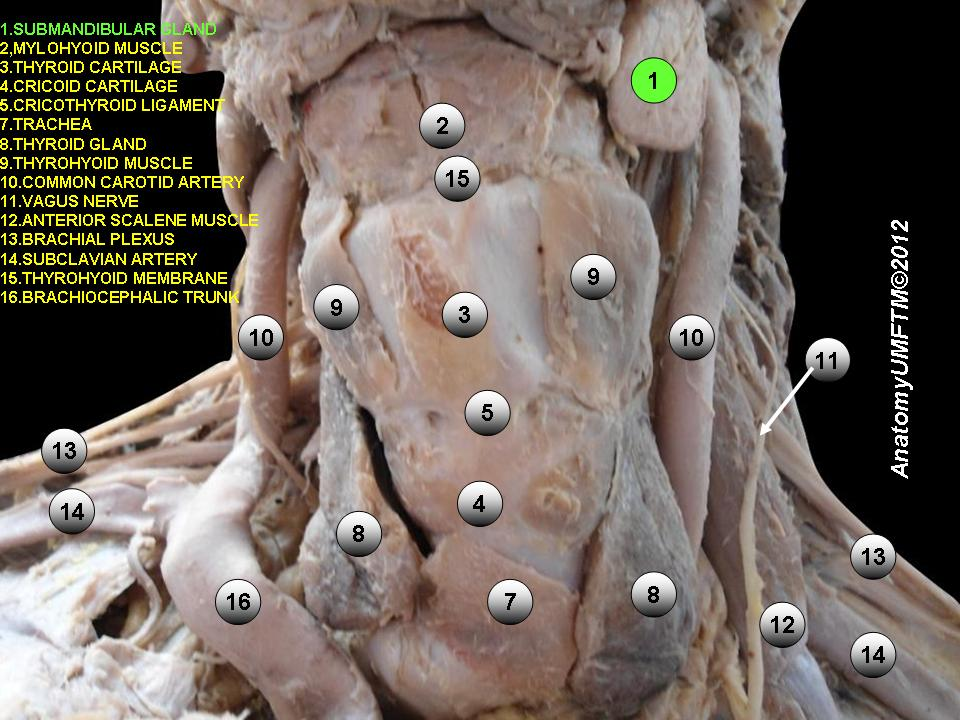
Submandibular gland, frontal view

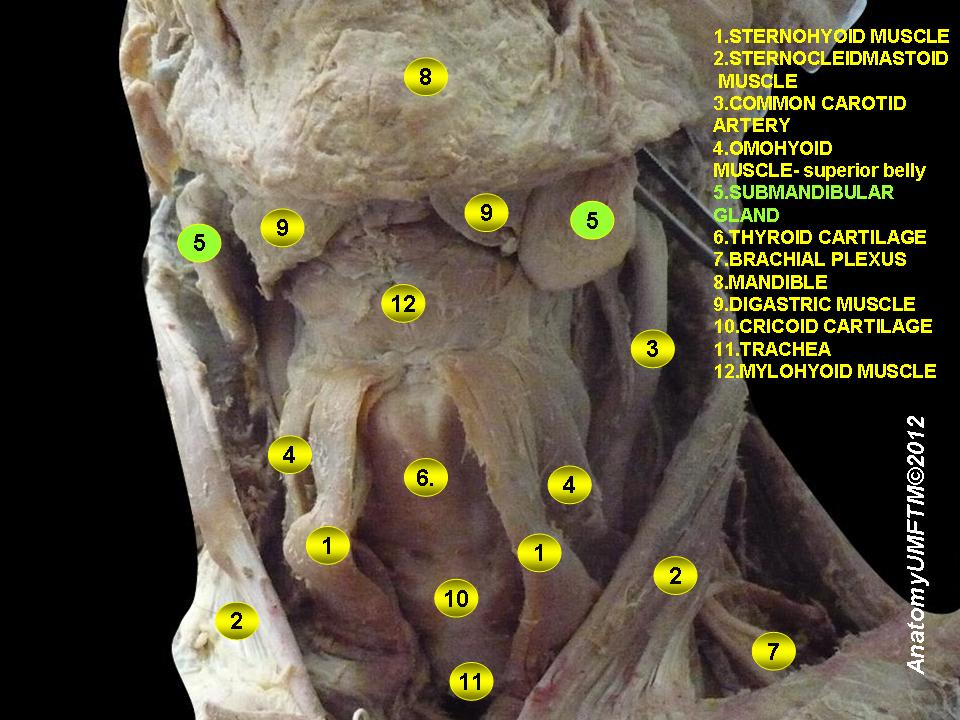
Submandibular gland

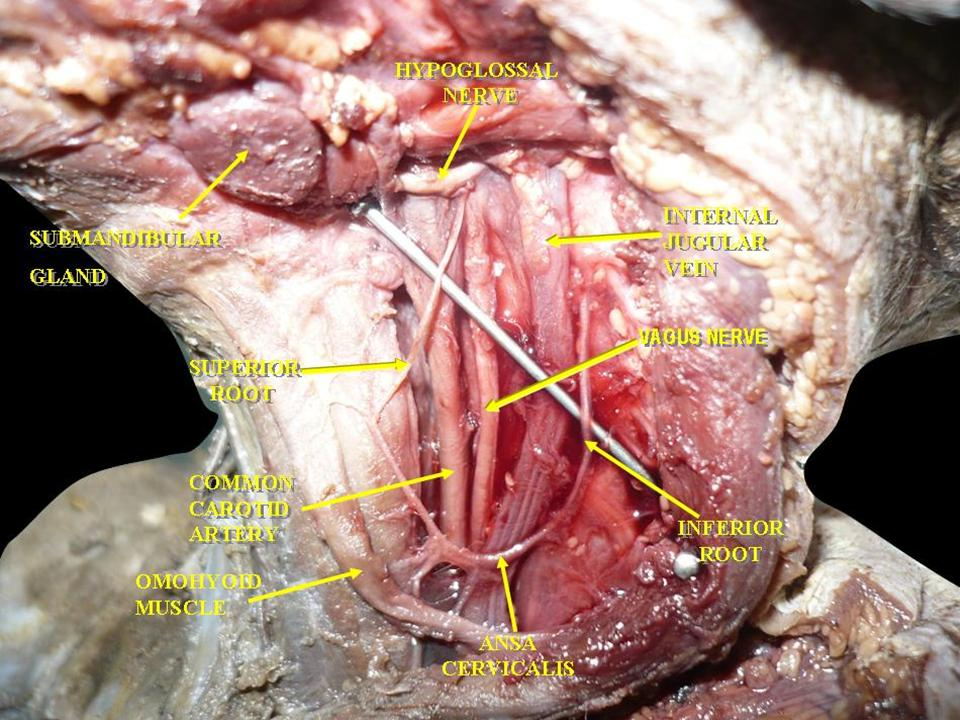
Muscles, arteries, and nerves of the neck in a newborn dissection

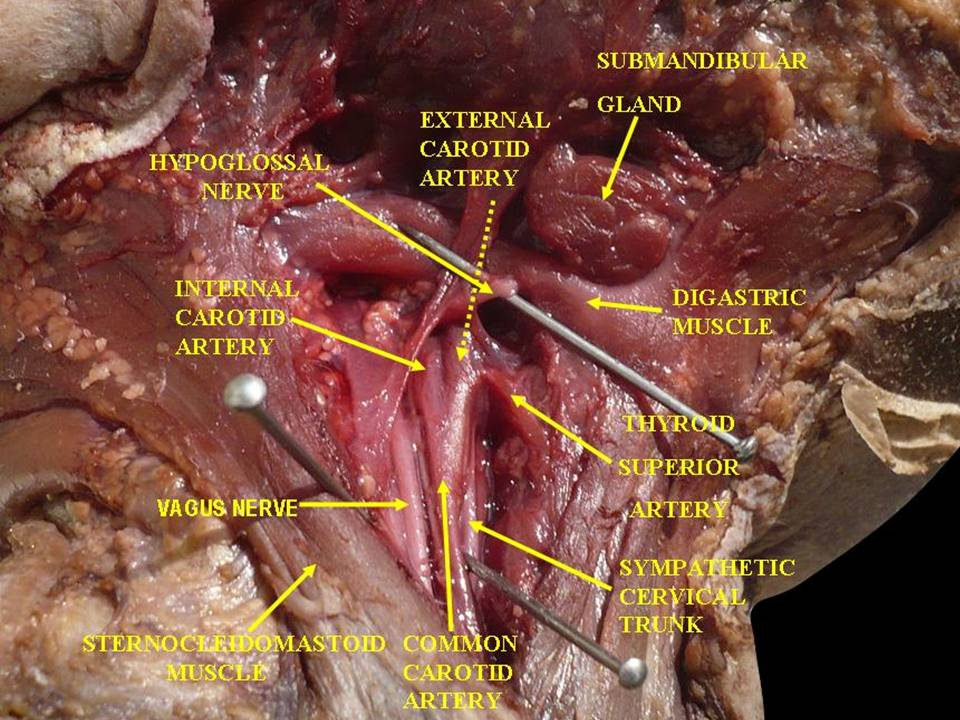
Muscles, arteries, and nerves of the neck in a newborn dissection

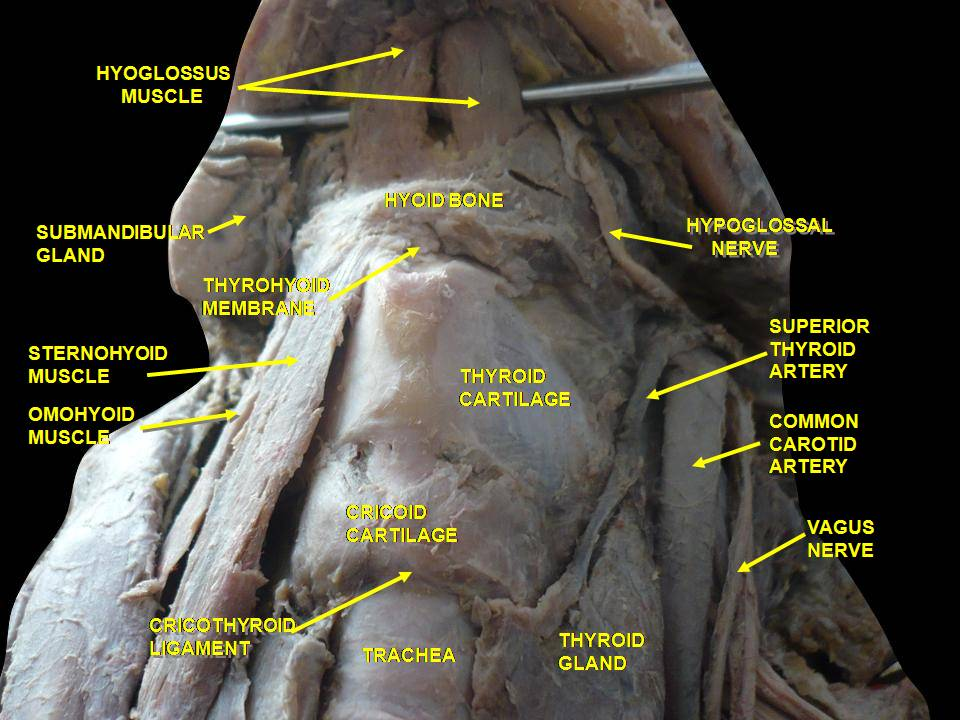
Muscles, nerves, and arteries of the neck, deep dissection, anterior view

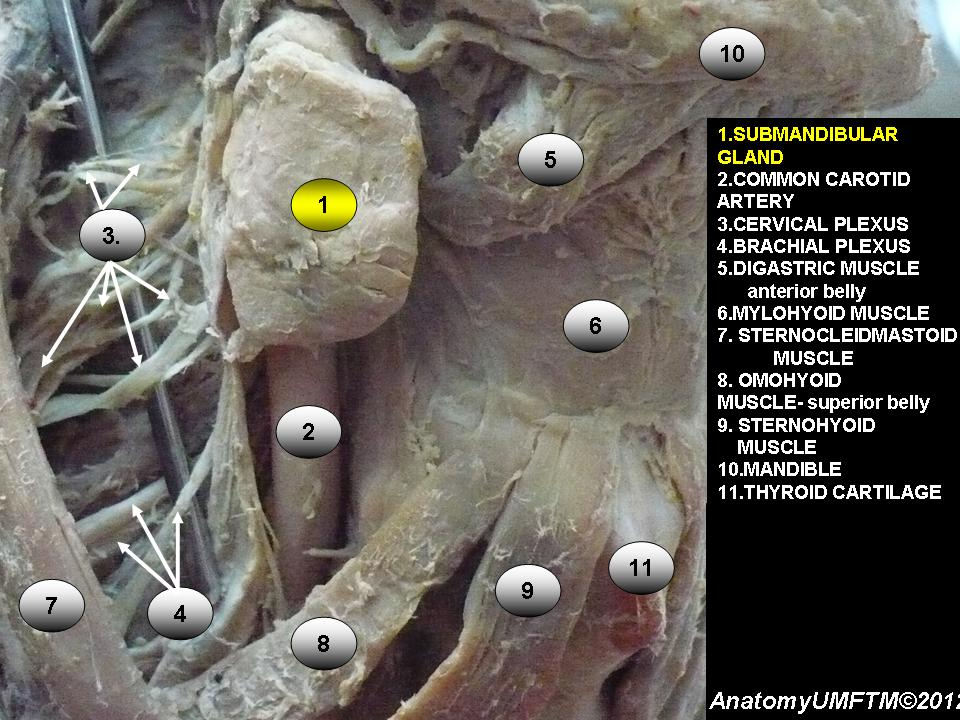
Submandibular gland

== See also ==
- Submandibular duct
- Immune-selective anti-inflammatory derivative (ImSAID)
