= Sialoendoscopy =

Minimally-invasive salivary gland surgical technique

- Other names: Sialendoscopy

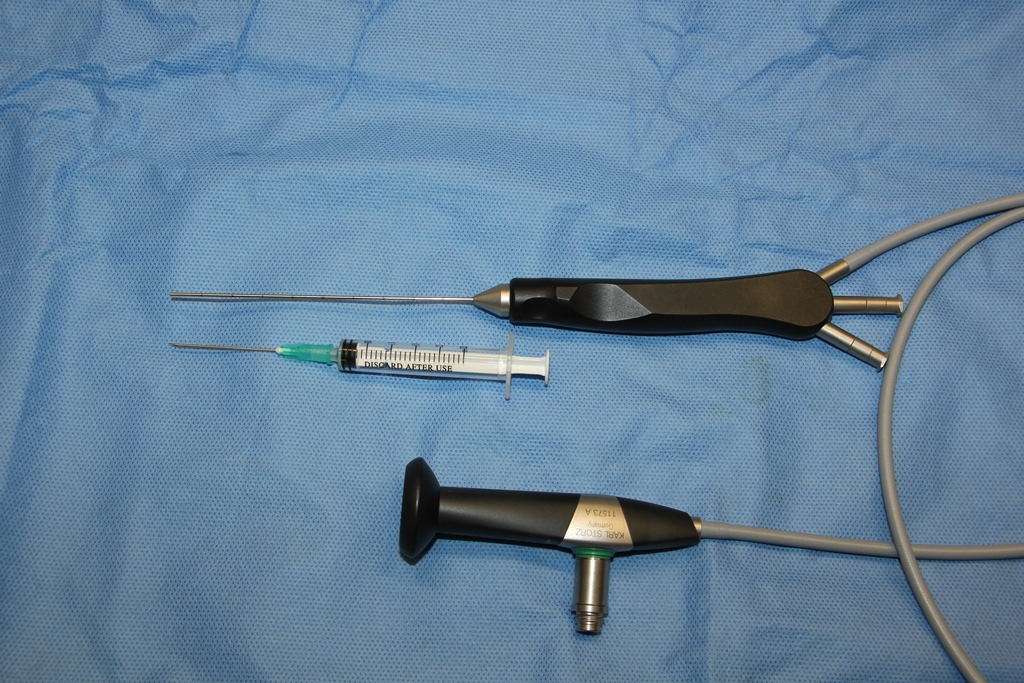
A small endoscopy needle

Sialoendoscopy is a minimally invasive technique that allows for salivary gland surgery for the safe and effective treatment of obstructive salivary gland disorders and other conditions of the salivary glands. During sialoendoscopy a small endoscope is placed into the salivary glands through the salivary ducts that empty into the mouth. The procedure is not exclusively diagnostic, but is interventional; thus, it can be used for the extraction of salivary stones, salivary duct lavage, dilatation of stenotic segments, or instillation of various medications such as corticosteroids or antibiotics. Thus, sialoendoscopy is an efficient yet simple mode of treatment for major salivary gland obstructions, strictures and sialoliths (salivary stones). Depending on the obstruction, sialoendoscopy can be conducted under local anesthesia in an outpatient office or in the operating room under general anesthesia.

== Conditions indicating sialoendoscopy ==
Salivary gland stones are one of the major causes of salivary gland infections (sialadenitis). These types of stones can be found in 1.2 percent of the general population.

The second leading cause of salivary obstruction is from strictures and adhesions, which can happen from prior salivary gland infections, including childhood infections like mumps. Most strictures could be seen in the parotid duct and mostly in the disease process of chronic recurrent sialadenitis.

== Description of the technique ==
Generally, the salivary duct opening needs to be either dilated or incised prior to introduction of the endoscope. Once the sialoendoscope is in place, saline is utilized to dilate the salivary duct and its branching.

Once the endoscopes are introduced into gland, the internal anatomy is explored either for diagnosis or for treatment of a specific disease entity. The endoscope is introduced into the gland through its natural orifice in the mouth or by making a small incision in the duct opening. These techniques for introduction are completely intraoral techniques.

=== Salivary gland stone removal ===
- When the diameter of the stone is 5mm or less, it can be removed purely by an endoscopic technique, particularly when the stone is located above the muscles that comprise the floor of the mouth. The four common techniques used to remove the salivary gland stones are:

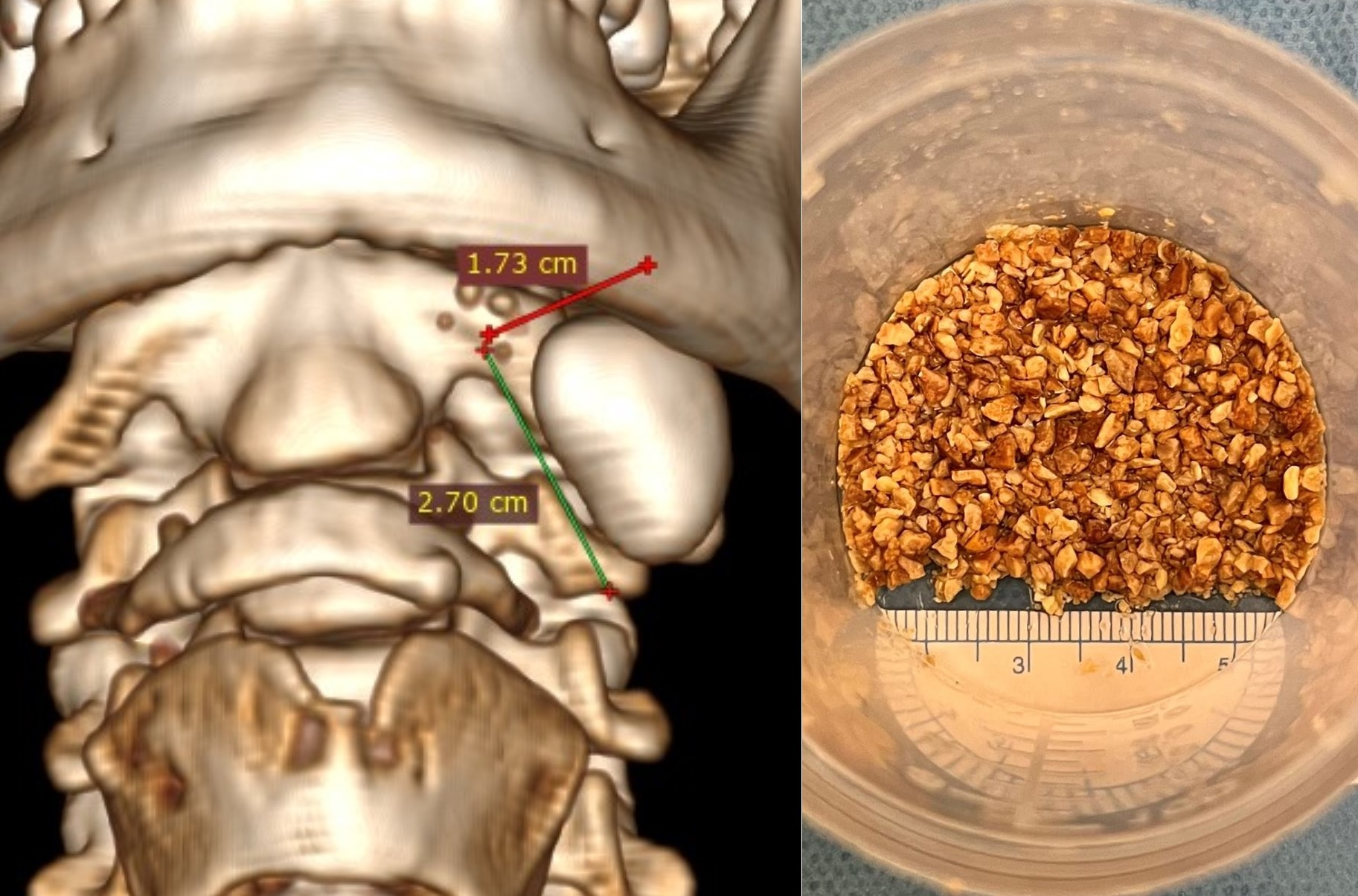
3D CT image of a left submandibular gland stone (27 × 22 × 17 mm) on the left, and the fragments after sialendoscopic intraductal pneumatic lithotripsy on the right. Cervical vertebrae and laryngeal cartilage are shown as anatomical landmarks. All fragments were removed using irrigation and forceps under sialendoscopic guidance. Source: own work, patient identity anonymized.

1. The grasping technique
2. Using a small wire basket retrieval system
3. Fragmentation techniques
- Mechanical fragmentation
- Pneumatic lithotripsy
- Laser lithotripsy
- Extracorporeal shock-wave lithotripsy (ESWL)

When the diameter is larger than 5 mm, a twofold (endoscopic assisted) approach can be utilized. The endoscope is introduced and the stone localized, and then dissected and removed in an intraoral approach. After a sialolith is removed from an affected gland, a sialastic stent is inserted into the duct for two to four weeks for the duration of the healing process of the oral region and until normal function of the gland is restored. This prevents scar formation which can develop overlying the ductal opening into the mouth.

=== Treatment of strictures and adhesions ===
In the case of strictures or adhesions, the following technique can be used as a treatment modality. First the surgeon will make their diagnosis and find the exact location of the obstruction using a sialogram. Following this, the surgeon can use the endoscopic method. The first step in this is anesthetizing and laving the duct with 2 percent lidocaine and saline. If there is no improvement, the surgeon then can insert a dilation balloon, which can be inflated up to 3 mm. The pressure created by the inflation can be sufficient to dilate most strictures. Another technique for dilating strictures is to expand the stricture region with grasping forceps used as a dilator.

== Instrumentation ==
The ability to perform this technique is the result of the development of miniaturized endoscopic imaging tools. The majority of sialoendoscopes that are currently in use are of the semirigid type. The semirigid endoscope allows for visualization of the diseased process, but the stiffness allows manipulation and navigation of the internal salivary anatomy.

Multiple types of micro instrumentation are available, including grasping forceps, biopsy forceps, drills, needles, laser fibers, and lithotripters (although the last is currently unavailable in the US pending U.S. Food and Drug Administration approval). Multiple companies make various types of sialoendoscopes and instrumentation. There are advantages and disadvantages to all of the systems and none are recommended over the other. Different practitioners utilize different systems due to the experience and clinical training of the surgeon.

== Milestones in sialoendoscopy ==
- 1990: Konigsberger and Gundlach separately performed sialoendoscopy when they introduced an endoscope into the major salivary glands.
- 1991, Katz introduced a 0.8-millimeter flexible endoscope to diagnose and treat salivary gland stones.
- 1994, Nahlieli used a rigid miniendoscope to diagnose and treat major salivary gland obstructions.
