= Submandibular duct =

Duct in the salivary gland

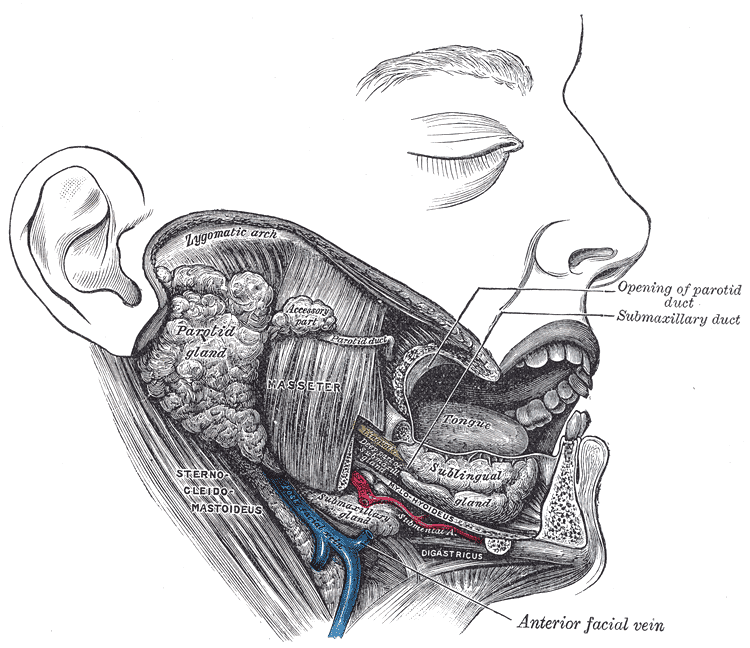
- Dissection, showing salivary glands of right side. (Labeled as "submaxillary duct", but is identified as "submandibular duct" in newer sources.)

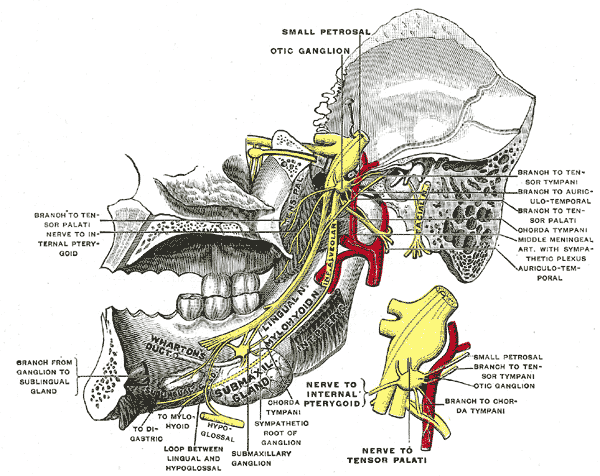
- Mandibular division of trifacial nerve, seen from the middle line. The small figure is an enlarged view of the otic ganglion. ("Wharton's duct" labeled in lower left.)

Details
- Location: Below mouth
- Source: Submandibular gland
- Drains to: Mouth
- Function: Drains saliva from submandibular gland to mouth

Identifiers
- Latin: ductus submaxillaris
- TA98: A05.1.02.012
- TA2: 2811
- FMA: 86266

The submandibular duct (also Wharton's duct or historically submaxillary duct) is one of the salivary excretory ducts. It is about 5 cm long, and its wall is much thinner than that of the parotid duct. It drains saliva from each bilateral submandibular gland and sublingual gland to the sublingual caruncle in the floor of the mouth.

== Structure ==
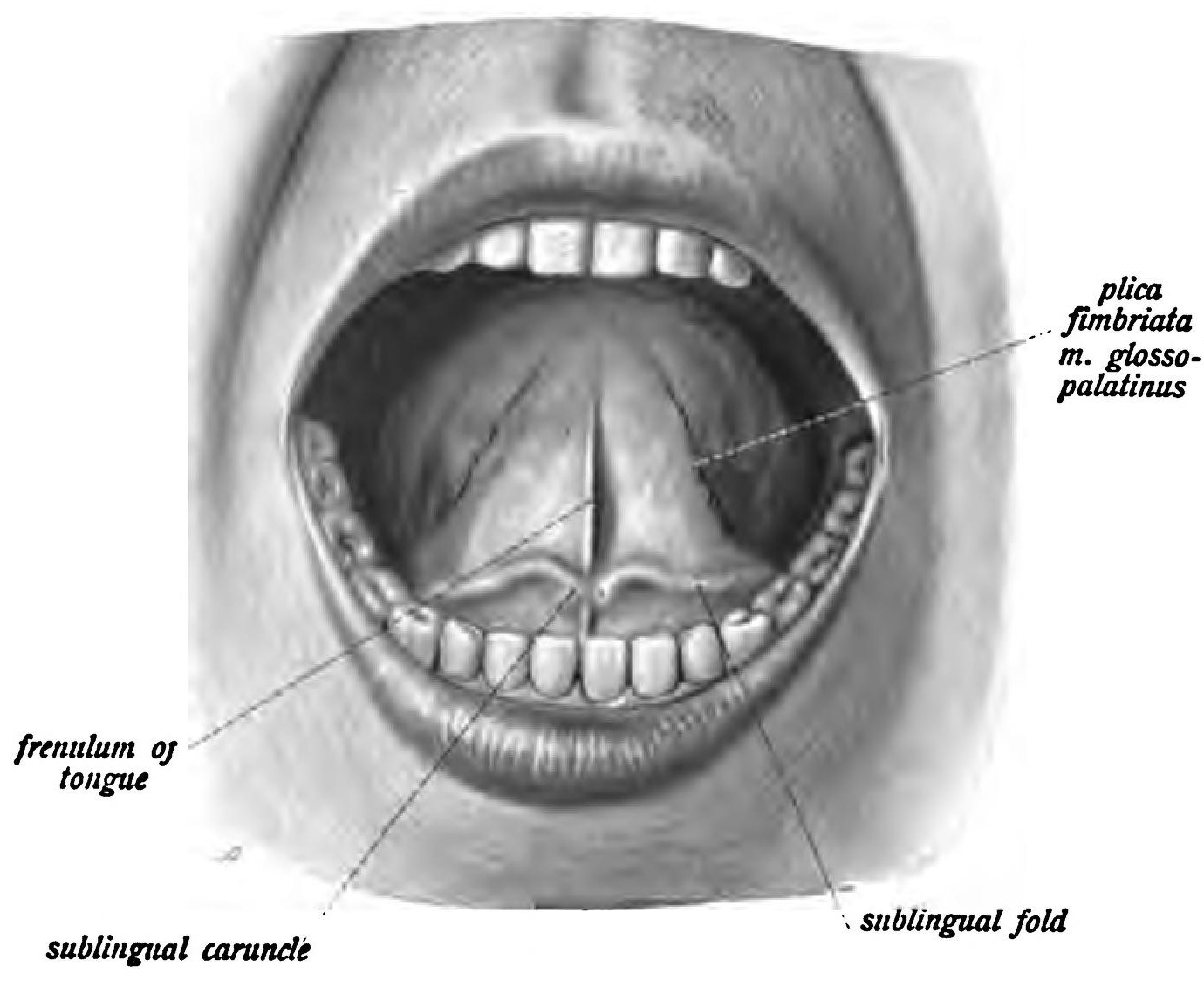
Picture of the mouth showing the sublingual caruncle and related anatomical structures

The submandibular duct arises from deep part of submandibular gland, a salivary gland. It begins by numerous branches from the superficial surface of the gland, and runs forward between the mylohyoid, hyoglossus, and genioglossus muscles. It then passes between the sublingual gland and the genioglossus and opens by a narrow opening on the summit of a small papilla (the "sublingual caruncle") at the side of the frenulum of the tongue. It lies superior to lingual and hypoglossal nerves.

=== Variation ===
The submandibular duct may be duplicated on one side or both sides, creating an accessory submandibular duct. Rarely, it may not perforate into the mouth.

== Function ==
The submandibular ducts drain saliva from the submandibular and sublingual glands to the sublingual caruncles in the floor of the mouth

== Clinical significance ==
=== Sialolithiasis ===
The submandibular duct may be affected by stones, known as sialolithiasis. These may grow large, requiring surgery to remove. Simple palpation may be used to identify the location of any stones before surgery.

=== Imperforate ===
Rarely, the submandibular duct may not perforate into the mouth. Surgery may be used to repair this birth defect.

=== Drooling ===
The exit of the submandibular gland into the mouth may be realigned in patients who drool. This redirects the exiting saliva away from the vestibule and the lips. This surgery has a fairly high success rate. Rarely, the submandibular gland may need to be removed on one or both sides.

== History ==
The submandibular duct was initially described by the English anatomist Thomas Wharton ( 1614-73) and is sometimes referred to by his name.
