= Sialolithiasis =

Formation of stones in the salivary glands

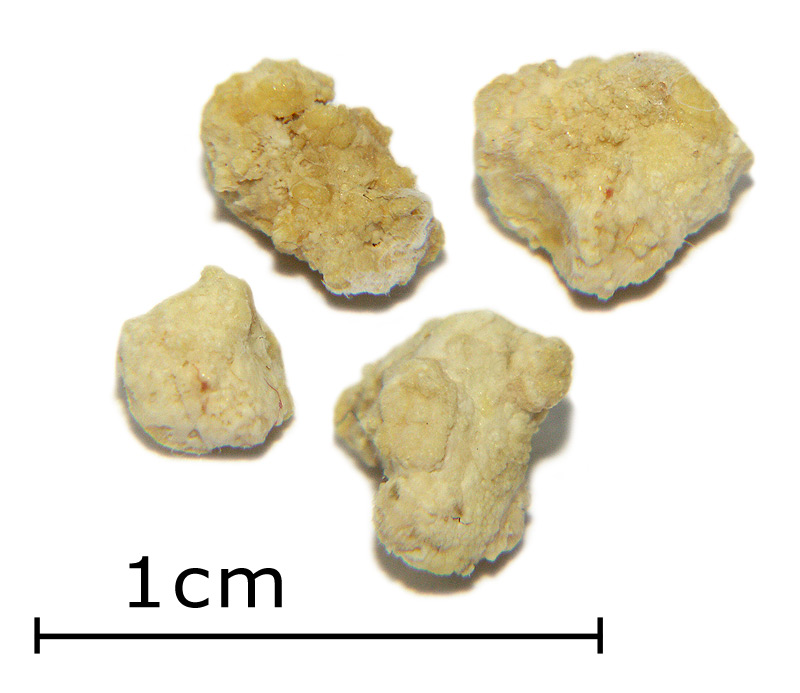
- Calculi (salivary gland stones) removed from the sublingual gland
- Specialty: Oral surgery

Sialolithiasis (also termed salivary calculi, or salivary stones) is a crystallopathy where a calcified mass or sialolith forms within a salivary gland, usually in the duct of the submandibular gland (also termed "Wharton's duct"). Less commonly the parotid gland or rarely the sublingual gland or a minor salivary gland may develop salivary stones.

The usual symptoms are pain and swelling of the affected salivary gland, both of which get worse when salivary flow is stimulated, e.g. with the sight, thought, smell or taste of food, or with hunger or chewing. This is often termed "mealtime syndrome." Inflammation or infection of the gland may develop as a result. Sialolithiasis may also develop because of the presence of existing chronic infection of the glands, dehydration (e.g. use of phenothiazines), Sjögren's syndrome and/or increased local levels of calcium, but in many instances the cause is idiopathic (unknown).

The condition is usually managed by removing the stone, and several different techniques are available. Rarely, removal of the submandibular gland may become necessary in cases of recurrent stone formation. Sialolithiasis is common, accounting for about 50% of all disease occurring in the major salivary glands and causing symptoms in about 0.45% of the general population. Persons aged 30–60 and males are more likely to develop sialolithiasis.

== Classification ==
The term is derived from the Greek words sialon (σίαλον, saliva) and lithos (stone), and the Greek -iasis meaning "process" or "morbid condition". A calculus (plural calculi) is a hard, stone-like concretion that forms within an organ or duct inside the body. They are usually made from mineral salts, and other types of calculi include tonsiloliths (tonsil stones) and renal calculi (kidney stones). Sialolithiasis refers to the formation of calculi within a salivary gland. If a calculus forms in the duct that drains the saliva from a salivary gland into the mouth, then saliva will be trapped in the gland. This may cause painful swelling and inflammation of the gland. Inflammation of a salivary gland is termed sialadenitis. Inflammation associated with blockage of the duct is sometimes termed "obstructive sialadenitis". Because saliva is stimulated to flow more with the thought, sight or smell of food, or with chewing, pain and swelling will often get suddenly worse just before and during a meal ("peri-prandial"), and then slowly decrease after eating, this is termed meal time syndrome. However, calculi are not the only reasons that a salivary gland may become blocked and give rise to the meal time syndrome. Obstructive salivary gland disease, or obstructive sialadenitis, may also occur due to fibromucinous plugs, duct stenosis, foreign bodies, anatomic variations, or malformations of the duct system leading to a mechanical obstruction associated with stasis of saliva in the duct.

Salivary stones may be divided according to which gland they form in. About 85% of stones occur in the submandibular gland, and 5–10% occur in the parotid gland. In about 0–5% of cases, the sublingual gland or a minor salivary gland is affected. When minor glands are rarely involved, caliculi are more likely in the minor glands of the buccal mucosa and the maxillary labial mucosa. Submandibular stones are further classified as anterior or posterior in relation to an imaginary transverse line drawn between the mandibular first molar teeth. Stones may be radiopaque, i.e. they will show up on conventional radiographs, or radiolucent, where they not be visible on radiographs (although some of their effects on the gland may still be visible). They may also symptomatic or asymptomatic, according to whether they cause any problems or not.

== Signs and symptoms ==
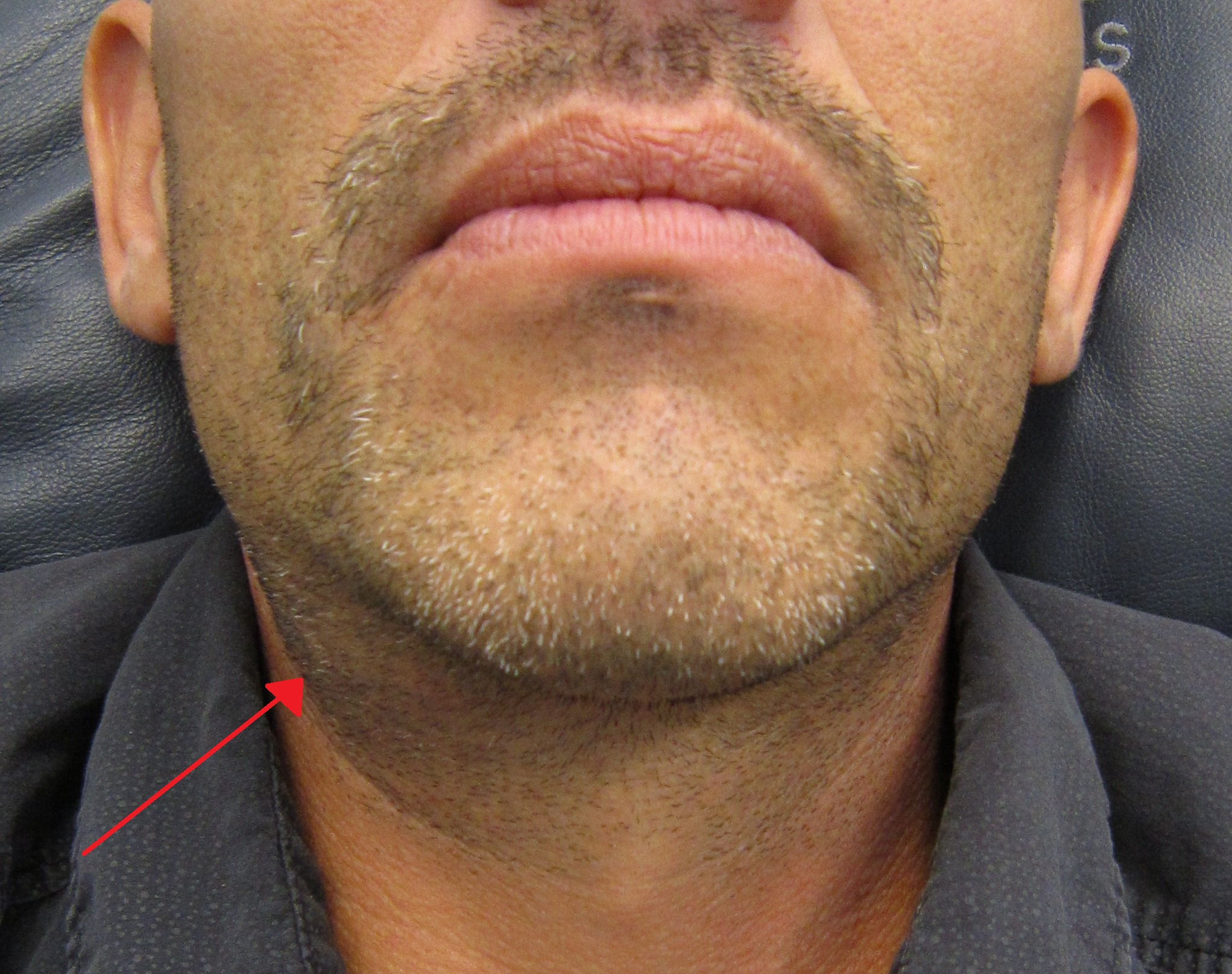
Swelling of the submandibular gland as seen from the outside

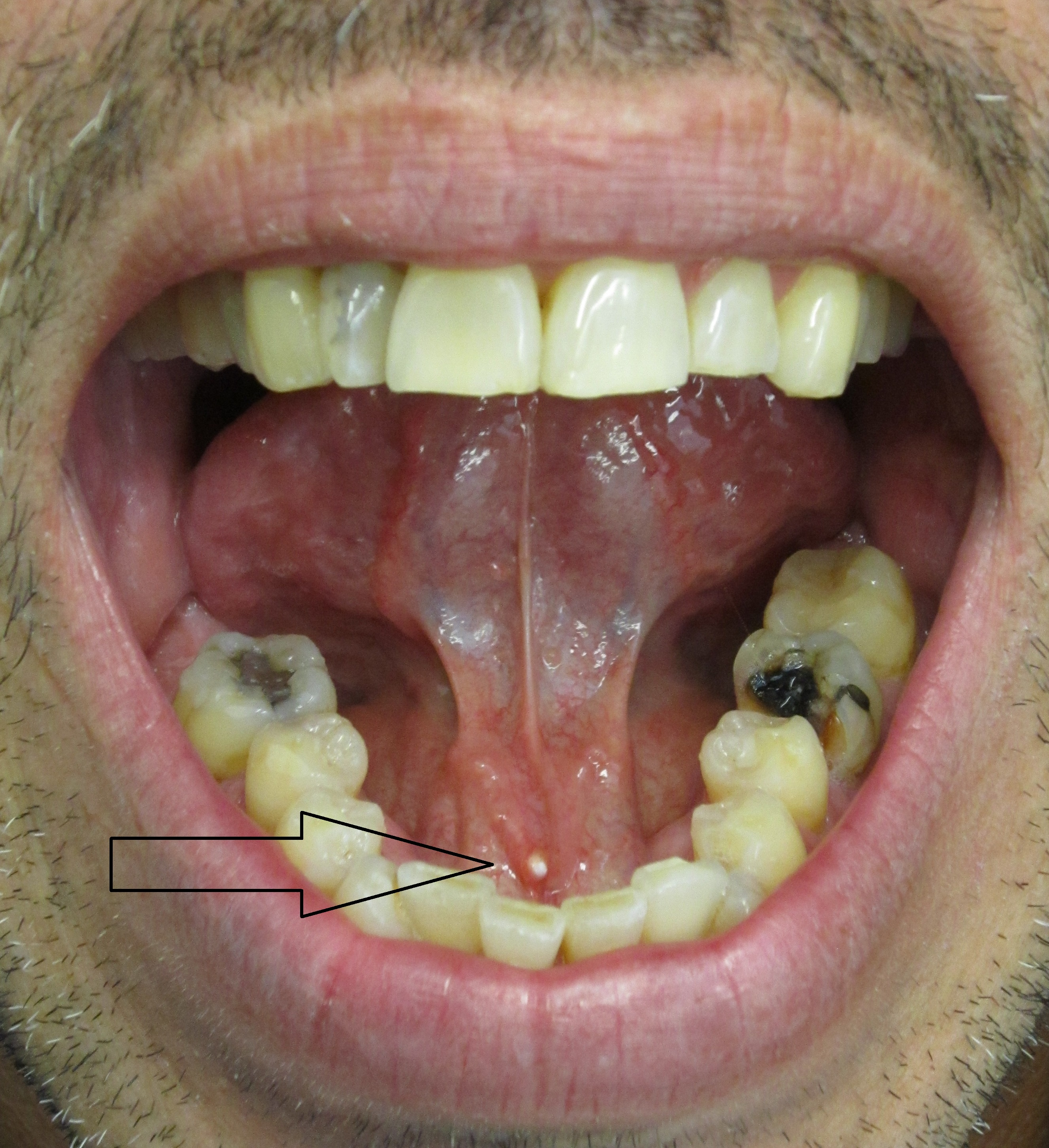
The stone seen in the submandibular duct on the person's right side

Signs and symptoms are variable and depend largely upon whether the obstruction of the duct is complete or partial, and how much resultant pressure is created within the gland. The development of infection in the gland also influences the signs and symptoms.

- Pain, which is intermittent, and may suddenly get worse before mealtimes, and then slowly get better (partial obstruction).
- Swelling of the gland, also usually intermittent, often suddenly appearing or increasing before mealtimes, and then slowly going down (partial obstruction).
- Tenderness of the involved gland.
- Palpable hard lump, if the stone is located near the end of the duct. If the stone is near the submandibular duct orifice, the lump may be felt under the tongue.
- Lack of saliva coming from the duct (total obstruction).
- Erythema (redness) of the floor of the mouth (infection).
- Pus discharging from the duct (infection).
- Cervical lymphadenitis (infection).
- In advanced cases, a fistula may form to the skin of the neck or cheek. See adjacent image demonstrating cutaneous fistulization.
- Bad breath.

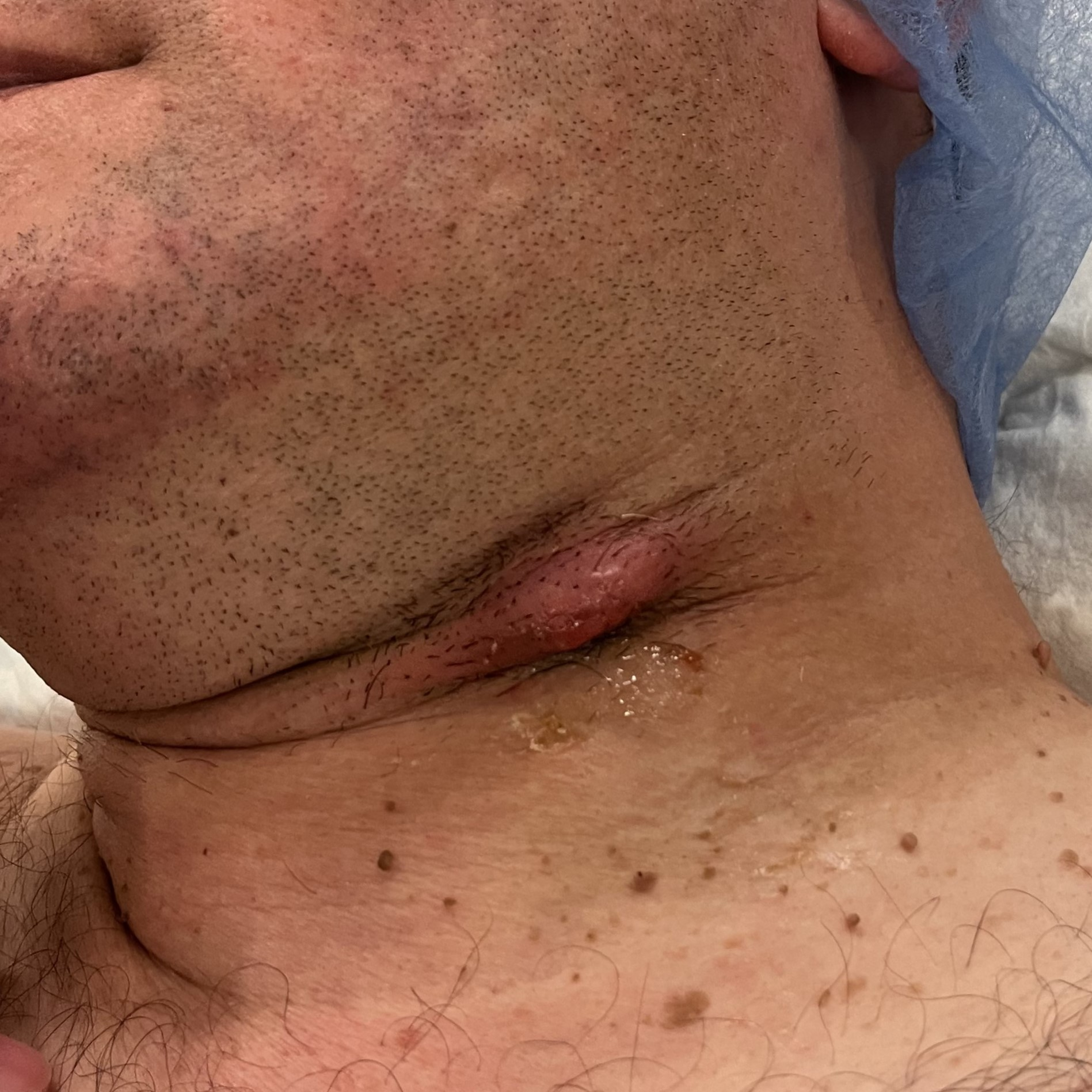
Chronic submandibular sialadenitis with skin fistula formation on the neck

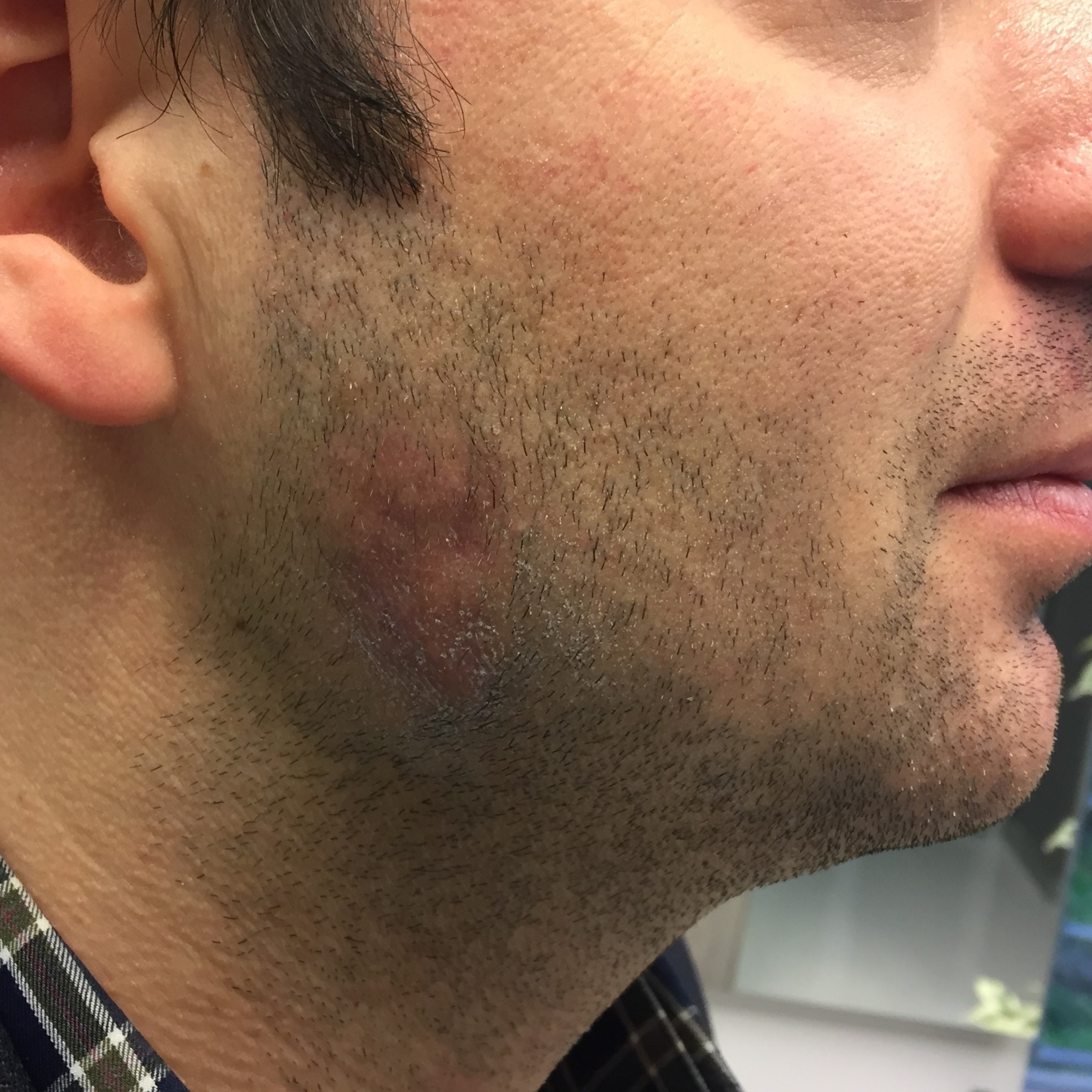
Acute parotid sialadenitis with skin fistula formation on the cheek

Rarely, when stones form in the minor salivary glands, there is usually only slight local swelling in the form of a small nodule and tenderness.

== Causes ==
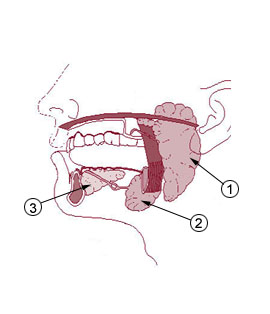
The major salivary glands (paired on each side). 1. Parotid gland, 2. Submandibular gland, 3. Sublingual gland.

There are thought to be a series of stages that lead to the formation of a calculus (lithogenesis). Initially, factors such as abnormalities in calcium metabolism, dehydration, reduced salivary flow rate, altered acidity (pH) of saliva caused by oropharyngeal infections, and altered solubility of crystalloids, leading to precipitation of mineral salts, are involved. Other sources state that no systemic abnormality of calcium or phosphate metabolism is responsible.

The next stage involves the formation of a nidus which is successively layered with organic and inorganic material, eventually forming a calcified mass. In about 15-20% of cases the sialolith will not be sufficiently calcified to appear radiopaque on a radiograph, and will therefore be difficult to detect.

Other sources suggest a retrograde theory of lithogenesis, where food debris, bacteria or foreign bodies from the mouth enter the ducts of a salivary gland and are trapped by abnormalities in the sphincter mechanism of the duct opening (the papilla), which are reported in 90% of cases. Fragments of bacteria from salivary calculi were reported to be Streptococci species which are part of the normal oral microbiota and are present in dental plaque.

Stone formation occurs most commonly in the submandibular gland for several reasons. The concentration of calcium in saliva produced by the submandibular gland is twice that of the saliva produced by the parotid gland. The submandibular gland saliva is also relatively alkaline and mucous. The submandibular duct (Wharton's duct) is long, meaning that saliva secretions must travel further before being discharged into the mouth. The duct possesses two bends, the first at the posterior border of the mylohyoid muscle and the second near the duct orifice. The flow of saliva from the submandibular gland is often against gravity due to variations in the location of the duct orifice. The orifice itself is smaller than that of the parotid. These factors all promote slowing and stasis of saliva in the submandibular duct, making the formation of an obstruction with subsequent calcification more likely.

Salivary calculi sometimes are associated with other salivary diseases, e.g. sialoliths occur in two thirds of cases of chronic sialadenitis, although obstructive sialadenitis is often a consequence of sialolithiasis. Gout may also cause salivary stones, although in this case they are composed of uric acid crystals rather than the normal composition of salivary stones.

== Diagnosis ==
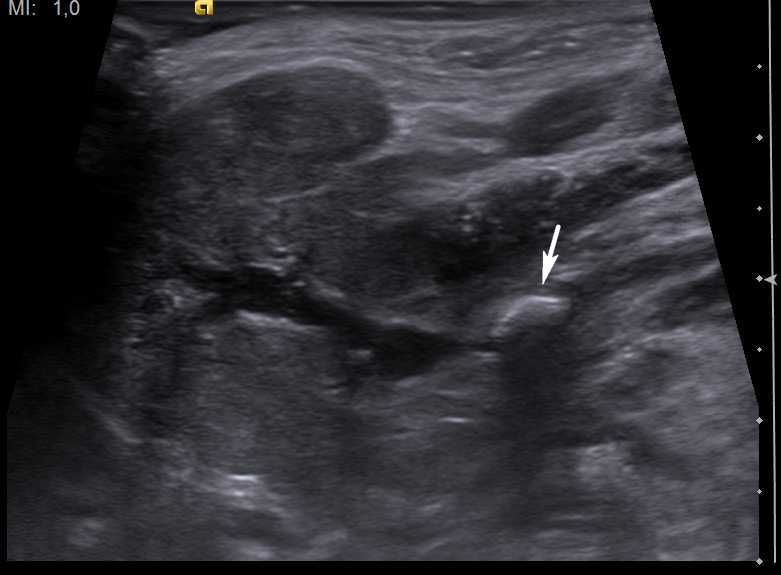
Ultrasound image of sialolithiasis

Stone resulting in inflammation and dilation of the duct

Diagnosis is usually made by characteristic history and physical examination. Diagnosis can be confirmed by x-ray (80% of salivary gland calculi are visible on x-ray), by sialogram, or by ultrasound.

== Treatment ==
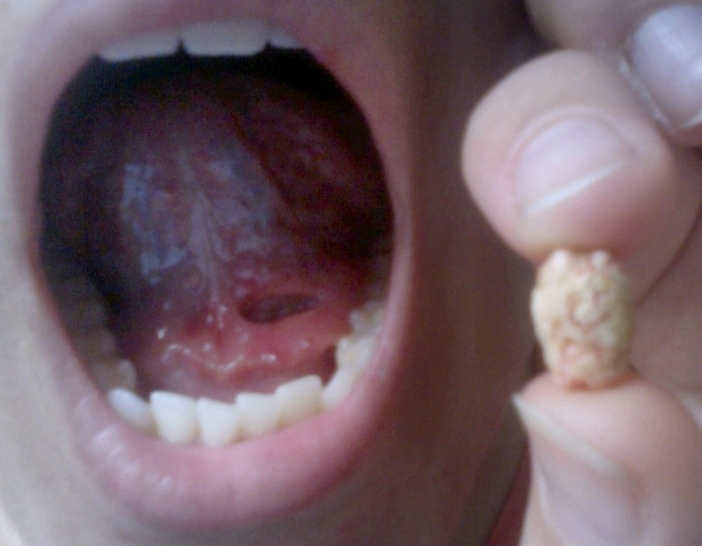
Salivary gland stone and the hole left behind from the operation

Some current treatment options are:

Non-invasive:

- For small stones, hydration, moist heat therapy, NSAIDs (nonsteroidal anti-inflammatory drugs) occasionally, and having the patient take any food or beverage that is bitter and/or sour. Sucking on citrus fruits, such as a lemon or orange, may increase salivation and promote spontaneous expulsion of stones within the size range of 2–10 mm.
- Some stones may be massaged out by a specialist.
- Shock wave therapy (Extracorporeal shock wave lithotripsy).

Minimally invasive:

- Sialendoscopy

Surgical:

- An ENT or oral/maxillofacial surgeon may cannulate the duct to remove the stone (sialectomy).
- A surgeon may make a small incision near the stone to remove it.
- In some cases when stones continually reoccur the offending salivary duct is removed.

Supporting treatment:

- To prevent infection while the stone is lodged in the duct, antibiotics are sometimes used.

== Epidemiology ==
The prevalence of salivary stones in the general population is about 1.2% according to post mortem studies, but the prevalence of salivary stones which cause symptoms is about 0.45% in the general population. Sialolithiasis accounts for about 50% of all disease occurring in major salivary glands, and for about 66% of all obstructive salivary gland diseases. Salivary gland stones are twice as common in males as in females. The most common age range in which they occur is between 30 and 60, and they are uncommon in children.
