= Gland =

Type of animal organ

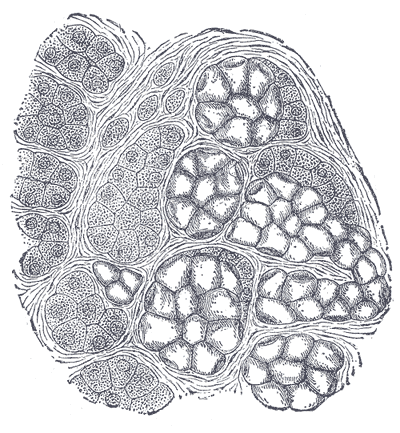
- Human submandibular gland. At the right is a group of mucous acini, at the left a group of serous acini.

Details

Identifiers
- Latin: glandula
- TH: H2.00.02.0.02002

A gland is a cell or an organ in an animal's body that produces and secretes different substances that the organism needs, either into the bloodstream or into a body cavity or outer surface. A gland may also function to remove unwanted substances such as urine from the body.

There are two types of gland, each with a different method of secretion. Endocrine glands are ductless and secrete their products, hormones, directly into interstitial spaces to be taken up into the bloodstream. Exocrine glands secrete their products through a duct into a body cavity or outer surface.

Glands are mostly composed of epithelial tissue, and typically have a supporting framework of connective tissue, and a capsule.

== Structure ==
=== Development ===
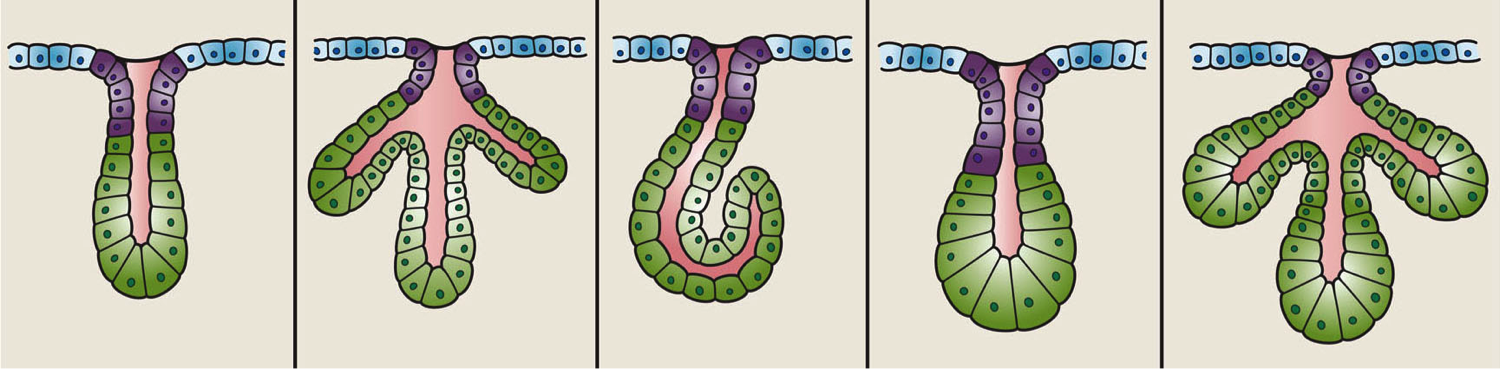
This image shows some of the possible glandular arrangements. These are the simple tubular, simple branched tubular, simple coiled tubular, simple acinar, and simple branched acinar glands.

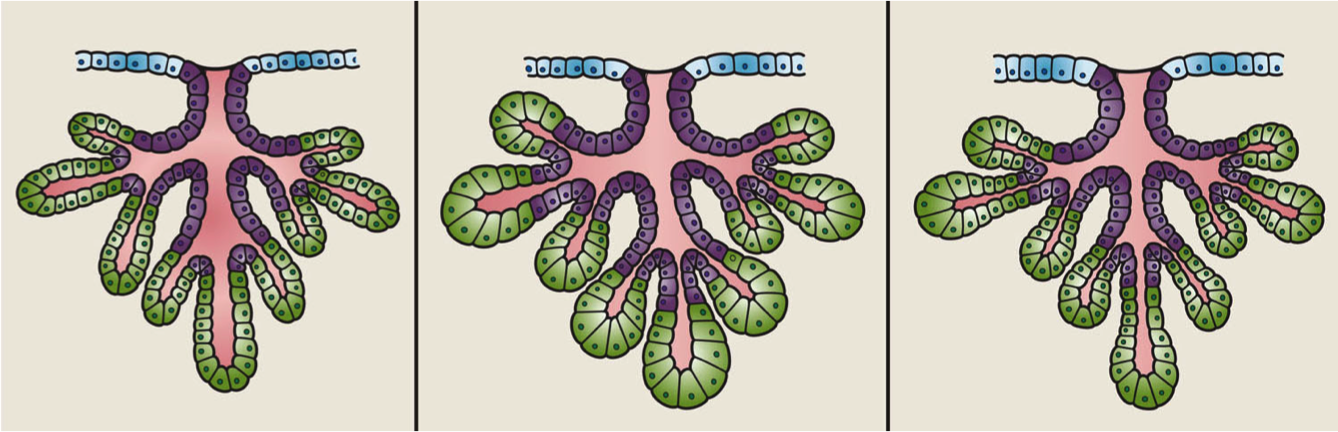
This image shows additional glandular arrangements. These are the compound tubular, compound acinar, and compound tubulo-acinar glands.

Every gland is formed by an ingrowth from an epithelial surface. This ingrowth may in the beginning possess a tubular structure, but in other instances glands may start as a solid column of cells which subsequently becomes tubulated.

As growth proceeds, the column of cells may split or give off offshoots, in which case a compound gland is formed. In many glands, the number of branches is limited, in others (salivary, pancreas) a very large structure is finally formed by repeated growth and sub-division. As a rule, the branches do not unite with one another. One exception to this rule is the liver; this occurs when a reticulated compound gland is produced. In compound glands the more typical or secretory epithelium is found forming the terminal portion of each branch, and the uniting portions form ducts and are lined with a less modified type of epithelial cell.

Glands are classified according to their shape.

- If the gland retains its shape as a tube throughout it is termed a tubular gland.
- In the second main variety of gland the secretory portion is enlarged and the lumens variously increased in size. These are termed alveolar or saccular glands.

== Types of glands ==
Glands are divided based on their function into two groups: endocrine and exocrine.

This diagram shows the differences between endocrine and exocrine glands. The major difference is that endocrine glands secrete substances into capillaries and blood vessels, while exocrine glands secrete substances via ducts onto body surfaces.

=== Endocrine glands ===
Endocrine glands secrete substances that circulate in the blood. The glands secrete their products through basal lamina into the bloodstream. Basal lamina typically can be seen as a layer around the glands to which more than a million tiny blood vessels are attached. These glands often secrete hormones which play an important role in maintaining homeostasis. The pineal gland, thymus, pituitary gland, thyroid gland, and the two adrenal glands are all endocrine glands.

=== Exocrine glands ===
Exocrine glands secrete their products through a duct onto an outer or inner surface of the body, such as the skin or the gastrointestinal tract. Secretion is directly onto the apical surface. The glands in this group can be divided into three groups:

- Merocrine glands – cells secrete their substances by exocytosis. (e.g. mucous and serous glands; also called "eccrine", e.g. major sweat glands of humans, goblet cells, salivary gland, tear gland and intestinal glands)
- Apocrine glands – a portion of the secreting cell's body is lost during secretion. The term Apocrine gland is often used to refer to the apocrine sweat glands, however it is thought that apocrine sweat glands may not be true apocrine glands as they may not use the apocrine method of secretion. (e.g. mammary gland, sweat gland of arm pit, pubic region, skin around anus, lips and nipples)
- Holocrine glands – the entire cell disintegrates to secrete its substances. (e.g. sebaceous glands: meibomian and zeis glands)

Exocrine glands can further be categorized by their product:

- Serous glands secrete a watery, often protein-rich, fluid-like product, e.g. sweat glands.
- Mucous glands secrete a viscous product, rich in carbohydrates (such as glycoproteins), e.g. goblet cells.
- Sebaceous glands secrete a lipid product. These glands are also known as oil glands, e.g. Fordyce spots and meibomian glands.

== Clinical significance ==
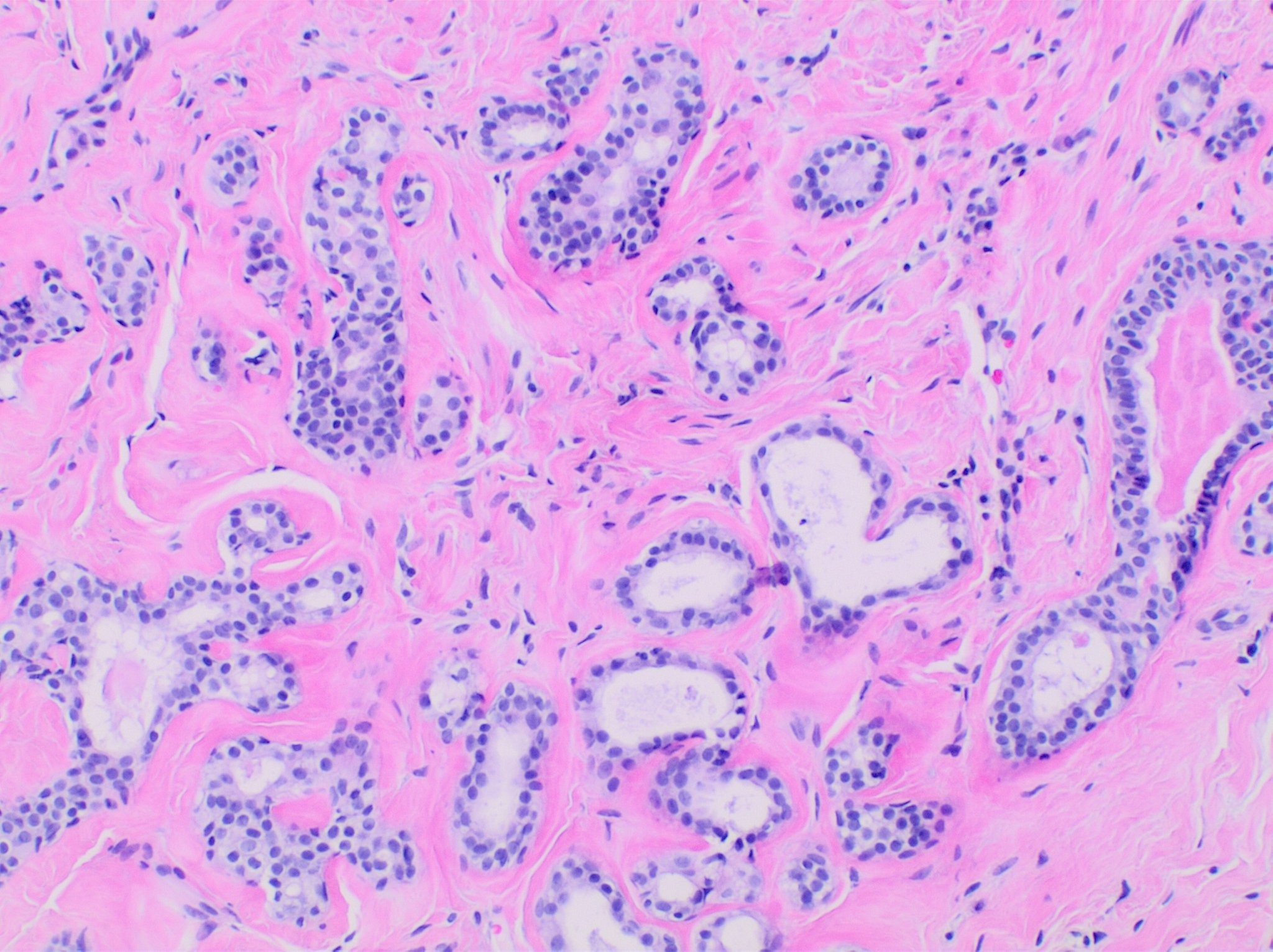
Histopathology of sclerosing adenosis of the breast.

Adenosis is any disease of a gland. The diseased gland has abnormal formation or development of glandular tissue which is sometimes tumorous.
