= Vesical =

Vesical (Latin: vesica) refers to the urinary bladder and its relevant and nearby structures and functions, including:

- the vesical arteries, which provide the urinary bladder with oxygenated blood
  - Superior vesical artery
    - Middle vesical artery
  - Inferior vesical artery
- the vesical venous plexus, the network of veins that collects deoxygenated blood from the urinary bladder
- the vesical veins, tributaries of the internal iliac veins, which drain the vesical venous plexus
- the vesical nervous plexus, a nerve network in the anterior pelvis
- the vesico-uterine pouch (or vesico-uterine excavation), a sac in the female pelvis in between the uterus and the urinary bladder
- Vesical tenesmus, difficulty urinating

== See also ==
- Vesicle (disambiguation)
