= Exocrine gland =

Gland that secretes substances onto an epithelial surface by way of a duct

- An acinus is a round cluster of exocrine cells connected to a duct.

Details

Identifiers
- Latin: glandula exocrina
- MeSH: D005088
- TH: H2.00.02.0.03014
- FMA: 9596

Exocrine glands are glands that secrete substances onto an epithelial surface by way of a duct. Examples of exocrine glands include sweat, salivary, mammary, ceruminous, lacrimal, sebaceous, prostate and mucous glands. Exocrine glands are one of two types of glands in the human body, the other being endocrine glands, which secrete their products directly into the bloodstream. The liver and pancreas are both exocrine and endocrine glands; they are exocrine glands because they secrete products—bile and pancreatic juice—into the gastrointestinal tract through a series of ducts, and endocrine because they secrete other substances directly into the bloodstream. Exocrine sweat glands are part of the integumentary system; they have merocrine and apocrine types.

== Classification ==
=== Structure ===
Exocrine glands contain a glandular portion and a duct portion, the structures of which can be used to classify the gland.

- The duct portion may be branched (called compound) or unbranched (called simple).
- The glandular portion may be tubular or acinar, or may be a mix of the two (called tubuloacinar). If the glandular portion branches, then the gland is called a branched gland.

=== Method of secretion ===
Depending on how their products are secreted, exocrine glands are categorized as merocrine, apocrine, or holocrine.

- Merocrine – the cells of the gland excrete their substances by exocytosis into a duct; for example, pancreatic acinar cells, eccrine sweat glands, salivary glands, goblet cells, intestinal glands, tear glands, etc.
- Apocrine – the apical portion of the cytoplasm in the cell membrane, which contains the excretion, buds off. Examples are sweat glands of arm pits, pubic region, skin around anus, lips and nipples; mammary glands, etc.
- Holocrine – the entire cell disintegrates to excrete its substance; for example, sebaceous glands of the skin and nose, meibomian gland, zeis gland, etc.
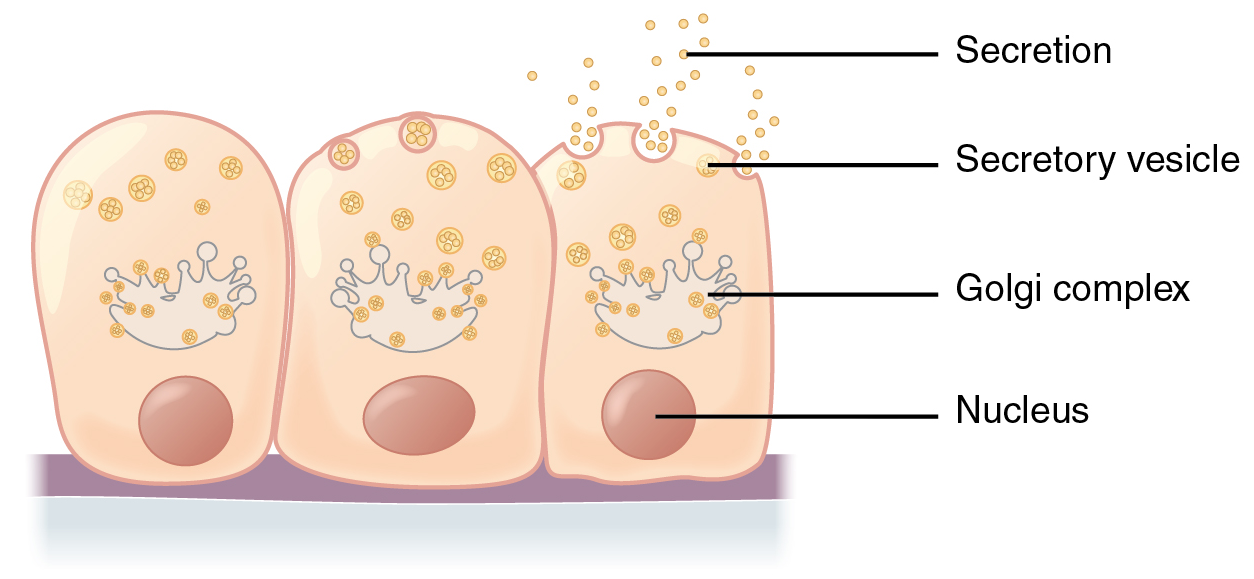
Merocrine secretion

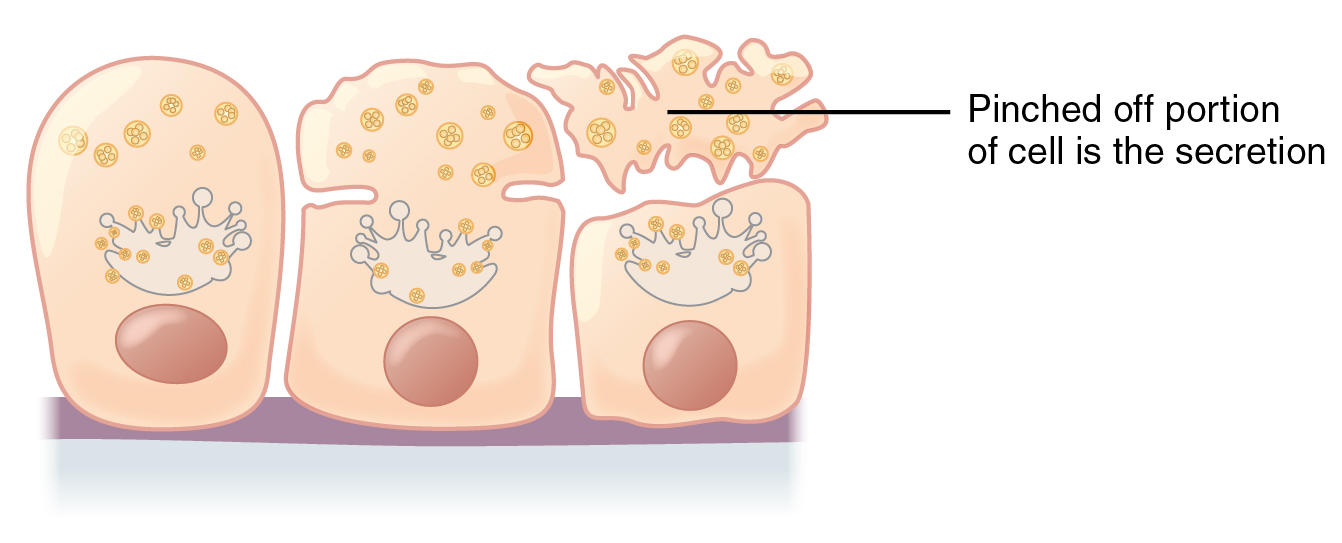
Apocrine secretion

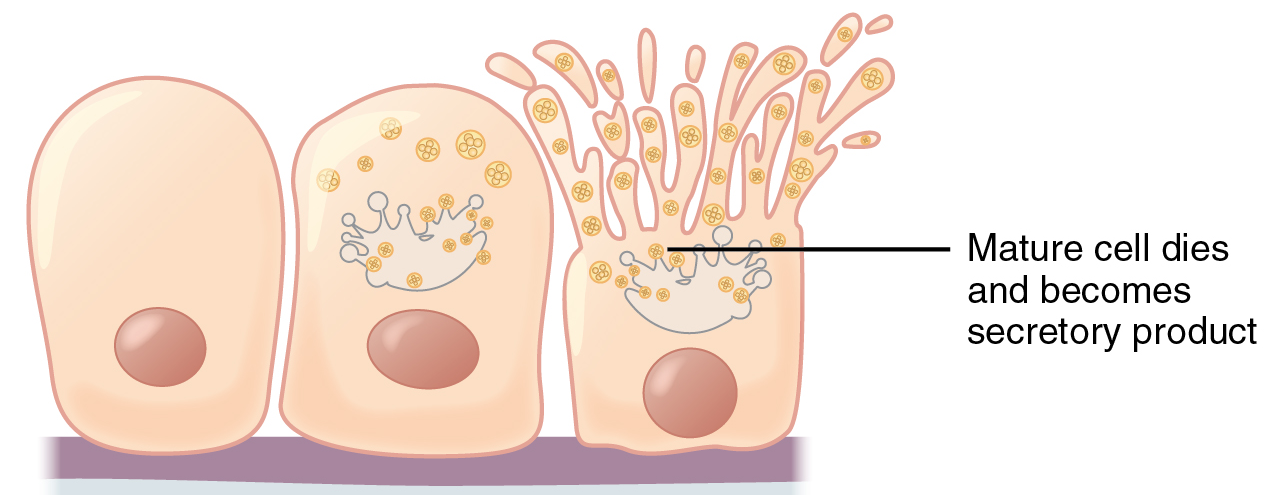
Holocrine secretion

=== Product secreted ===
- Serous cells secrete proteins, often enzymes. Examples include gastric chief cells and Paneth cells
- Mucous cells secrete mucus. Examples include Brunner's glands, esophageal glands, and pyloric glands
- Seromucous glands (mixed) secrete both protein and mucus. Examples include the salivary glands: although the parotid gland (saliva secretion 25%) is predominantly serous, the sublingual gland (saliva secretion 5%) mainly mucous gland, and the submandibular gland (saliva secretion 70%) is a mixed, mainly serous gland.
- Sebaceous glands secrete sebum, a lipid product. These glands are also known as oil glands, e.g. Fordyce spots and Meibomian glands.

== Additional images ==
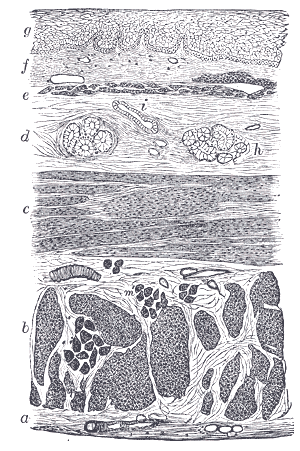
Section of the human esophagus.

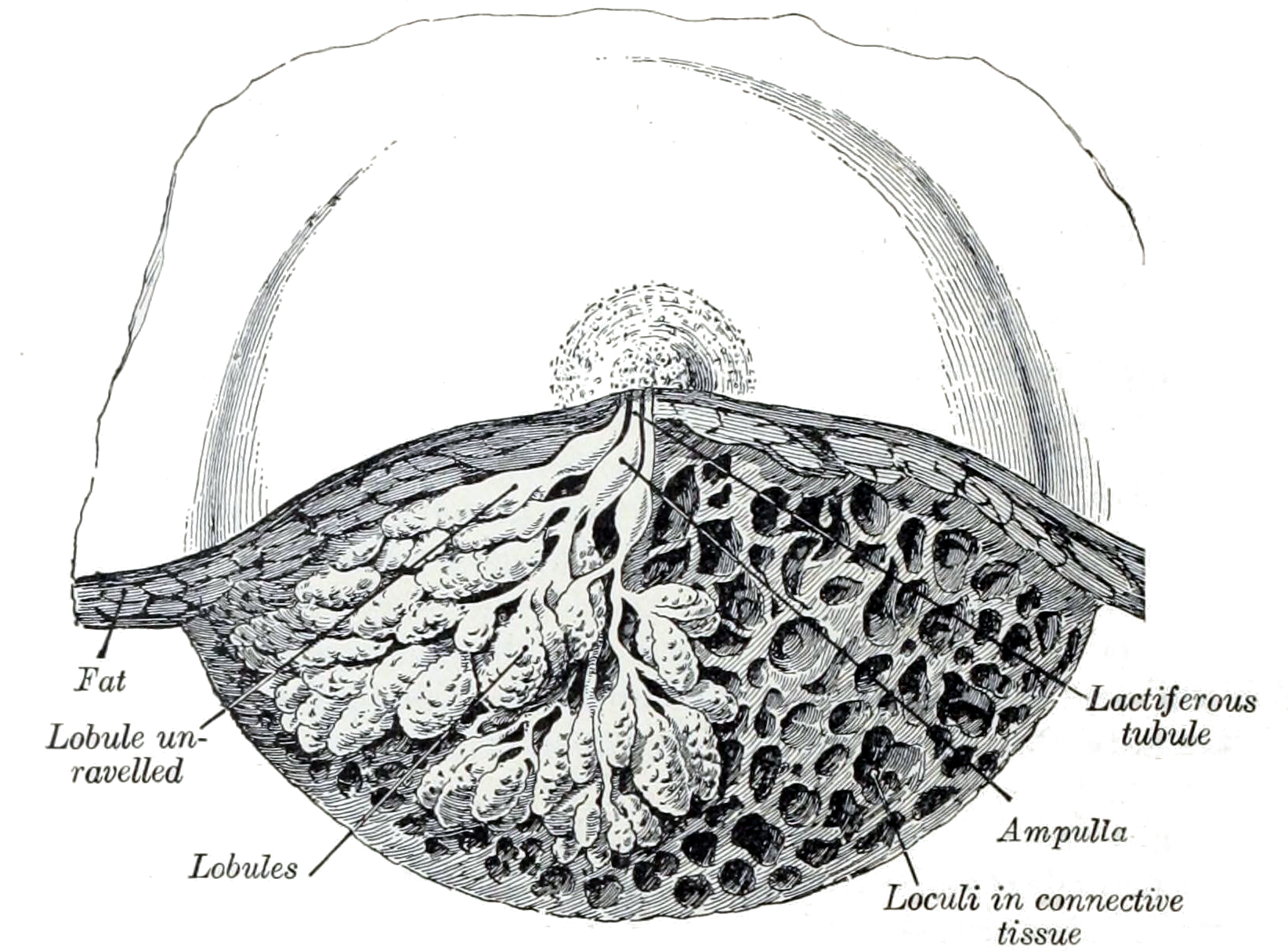
Dissection of a lactating breast.

== See also ==
- List of glands of the human body
- List of specialized glands within the human integumentary system
