= Amylacea =

Amylacea may refer to:

- A Latinate biological word meaning starchy
- Corpora amylacea, dense accumulations of calcified proteinaceous material in the ducts of prostates in older men
