= Pudendal plexus =

Pudendal plexus can refer to:

- Pudendal plexus (nerves)
- Pudendal plexus (veins)
