= Pudendal veins =

Pudendal veins may refer to:

- External pudendal veins
- Internal pudendal veins
- Pudendal plexus
