= Vesicle =

Vesicle may refer to:

== Cell biology ==
- Vesicle (biology and chemistry), a supramolecular assembly of lipid molecules, like a cell membrane
- Synaptic vesicle

== Human embryology ==
- Vesicle (embryology), bulge-like features of the early neural tube during embryonic brain development
- Auditory vesicle
- Optic vesicles

== Human anatomy and morphology ==
- Seminal vesicle
- Vesicle (dermatology), a liquid-filled cavity under the epidermis, commonly called a blister
- Bleb (medicine), a blister-like protrusion filled with serous fluid

== Non-human morphology ==
- Subsporangial vesicle
- Juice vesicles, the pulp found in the endocarp of common citrus members

== Geology ==
- Vesicular texture, a small enclosed cavity found in some volcanic rock, such as basalt

== See also ==
- Vesical (disambiguation)
