= Prostatic venous plexus =

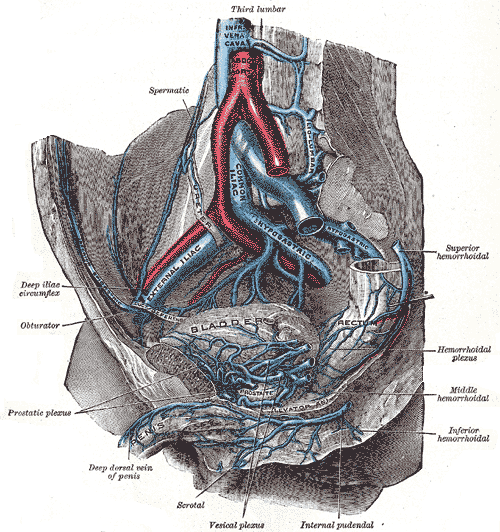
- The veins of the right half of the male pelvis. (Prostatic plexus labeled at bottom left.)

Details
- Drains from: Prostate
- Source: Deep dorsal vein of the penis
- Drains to: Vesical venous plexus and pudendal plexus

Identifiers
- Latin: plexus venosus prostaticus
- TA98: A12.3.10.013M
- TA2: 5043
- FMA: 29711

The prostatic veins form a well-marked prostatic plexus which lies partly in the fascial sheath of the prostate and partly between the sheath and the prostatic capsule. It collects blood from the prostate, and (via the v. dorsalis profunda clitoridis) the corpora cavernosa of penis. It communicates with the pudendal and vesical plexuses.

It is sometimes known as "Santorini's plexus", named for the Italian anatomist Giovanni Domenico Santorini.

== Clinical significance ==
The prostatic venous plexus drains into the internal iliac vein which in turn connects with the vertebral venous plexus; this is thought to be the route of bone metastasis of prostate cancer.
