= Holocrine =

Term used to classify the mode of secretion in exocrine glands in the study of histology

Exocrine secretion
Merocrine or eccrine – by exocytosis
Apocrine – by membrane budding (loss of cytoplasm)
Holocrine – by membrane rupture

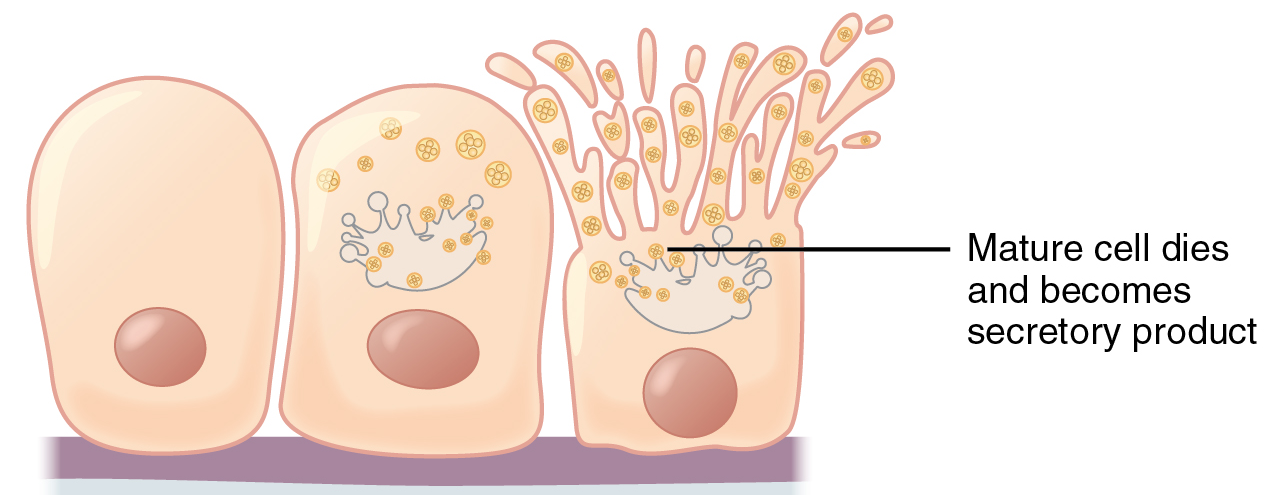
Holocrine secretion

Holocrine (from Ancient Greek ὅλος; hólos, “whole, entire” + κρῑ́νω; krī́nō, “to separate”) is a term used to classify the mode of secretion in exocrine glands in the study of histology. Holocrine secretions are produced in the cytoplasm of the cell and released by the rupture of the plasma membrane, which destroys the cell and results in the secretion of the product into the lumen.

Holocrine gland secretion is the most damaging (to the cell itself and not to the host which begot the cell) type of secretion, with merocrine secretion being the least damaging and apocrine secretion falling in between.

Examples of holocrine glands include the sebaceous glands of the skin and the meibomian glands of the eyelid. The sebaceous gland is an example of a holocrine gland because its product of secretion (sebum) is released with remnants of dead cells.
