= Merocrine =

Secretory mechanism

Exocrine secretion
Merocrine or eccrine – by exocytosis
Apocrine – by membrane budding (loss of cytoplasm)
Holocrine – by membrane rupture

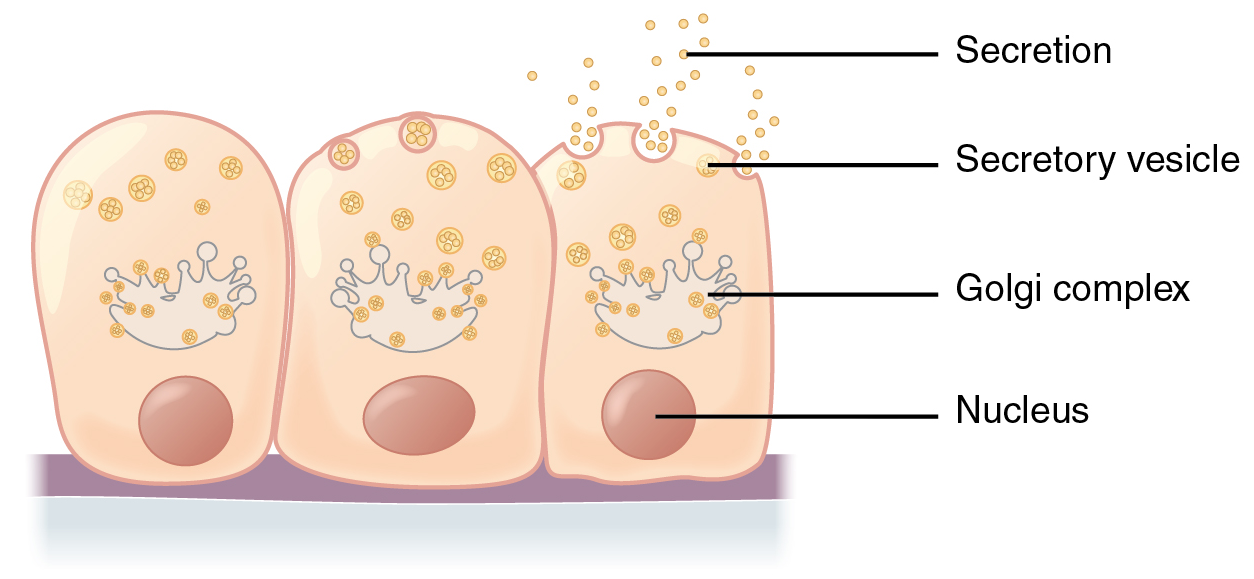
Merocrine secretion

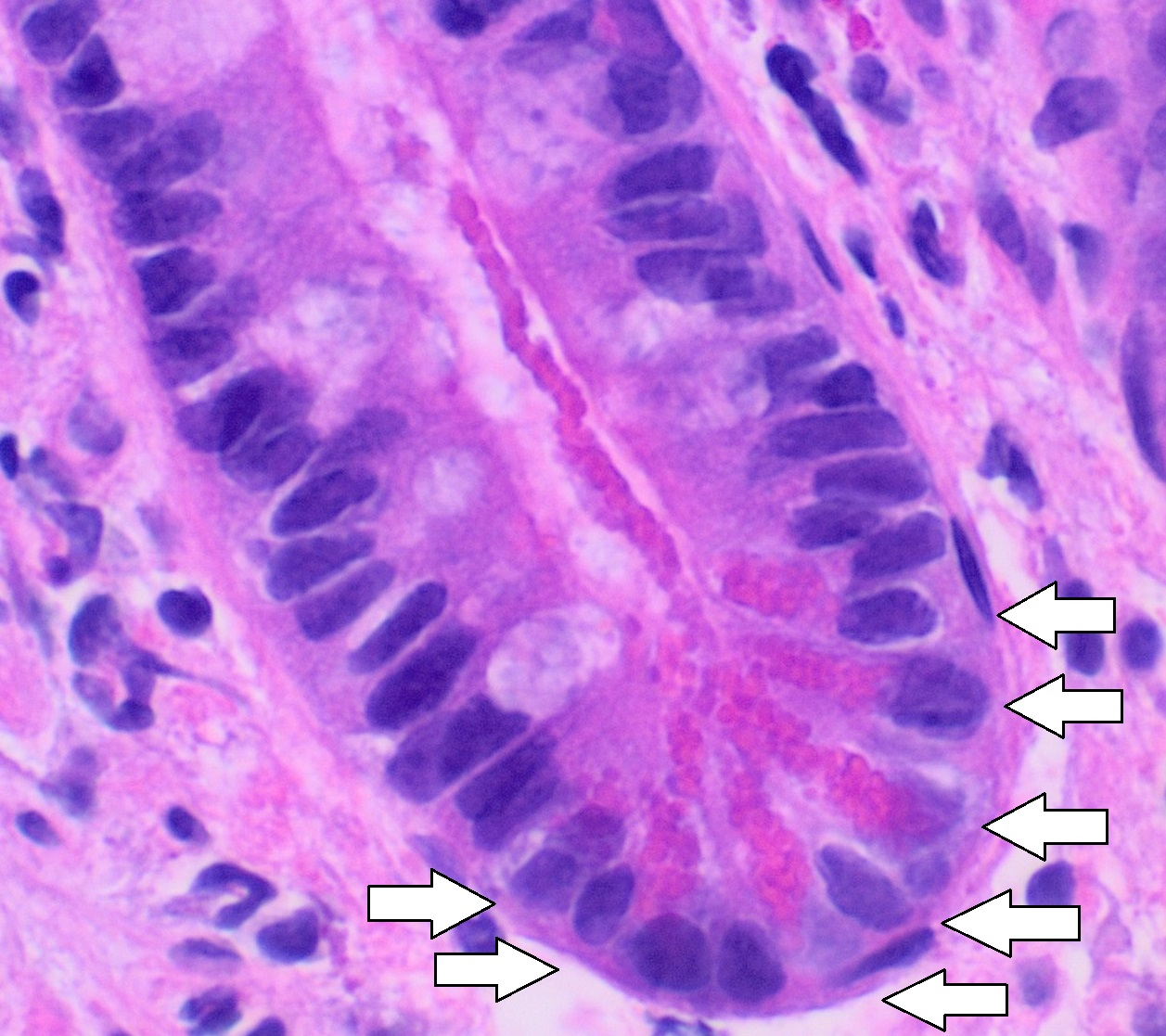
Paneth cells, located at the base of the crypts of the small intestinal mucosa, and displaying merocrine secretion of bright red cytoplasmic granules. H&E stain.

Merocrine (or eccrine) is a term used to classify exocrine glands and their secretions in the study of histology. A cell is classified as merocrine if the secretions of that cell are excreted via exocytosis from secretory cells into an epithelial-walled duct or ducts and then onto a bodily surface or into the lumen.

Merocrine is the most common manner of secretion. The gland releases its product and no part of the gland is lost or damaged (compare holocrine and apocrine).

The term eccrine is specifically used to designate merocrine secretions from sweat glands (eccrine sweat glands), although the term merocrine is often used interchangeably.

== Examples ==
- Salivary glands – Exocrine glands that produce saliva through a system of ducts
- Pancreatic glands – Organ of the digestive system and endocrine system of vertebrates
- Paneth cells of the intestine
- Certain sweat glands
