= Vesical venous plexus =

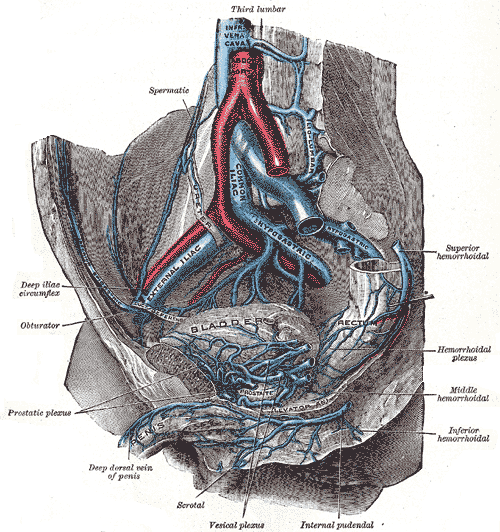
- The veins of the right half of the male pelvis.

Details
- Drains from: Urinary bladder
- Drains to: Internal iliac vein
- Artery: Superior vesical artery Inferior vesical artery

Identifiers
- Latin: plexus venosus vesicalis
- TA98: A12.3.10.012
- TA2: 5039
- FMA: 18934

The vesical venous plexus is a venous plexus situated at the fundus of the urinary bladder. It collects venous blood from the urinary bladder in both sexes, from the accessory sex glands in males, and from the corpora cavernosa of clitoris in females (via the v. dorsalis profunda clitoridis). It drains into the internal iliac veins via several vesical veins.

== Structure ==
The vesical venous plexus envelops the inferior part of the bladder and the base of the prostate.

=== Anastomoses ===
It communicates with the pudendal and prostatic plexuses.
