= Corpora amylacea =

Name for a variety of small anatomical masses

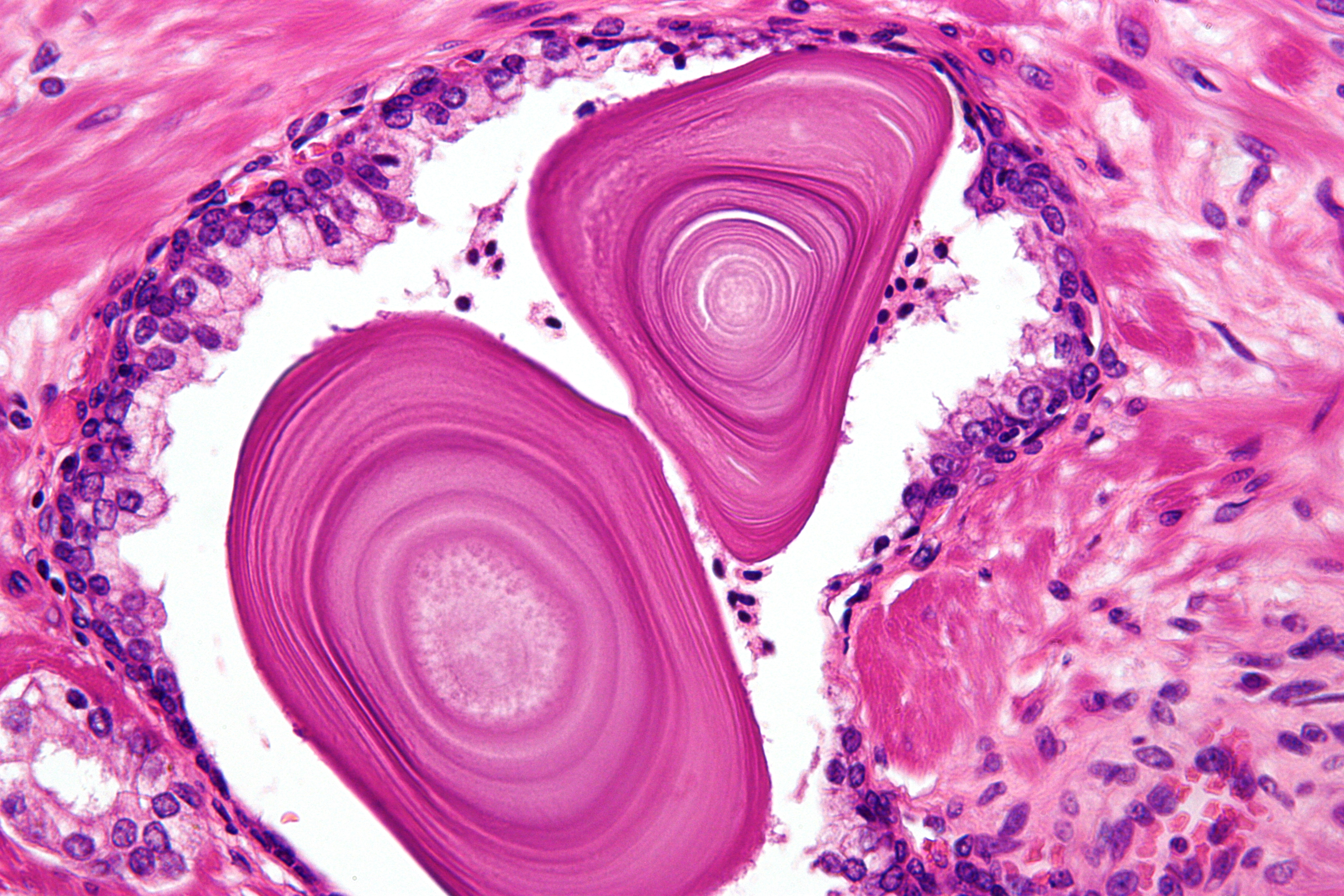
Micrograph of corpora amylacea in benign prostatic glands. H&E stain.

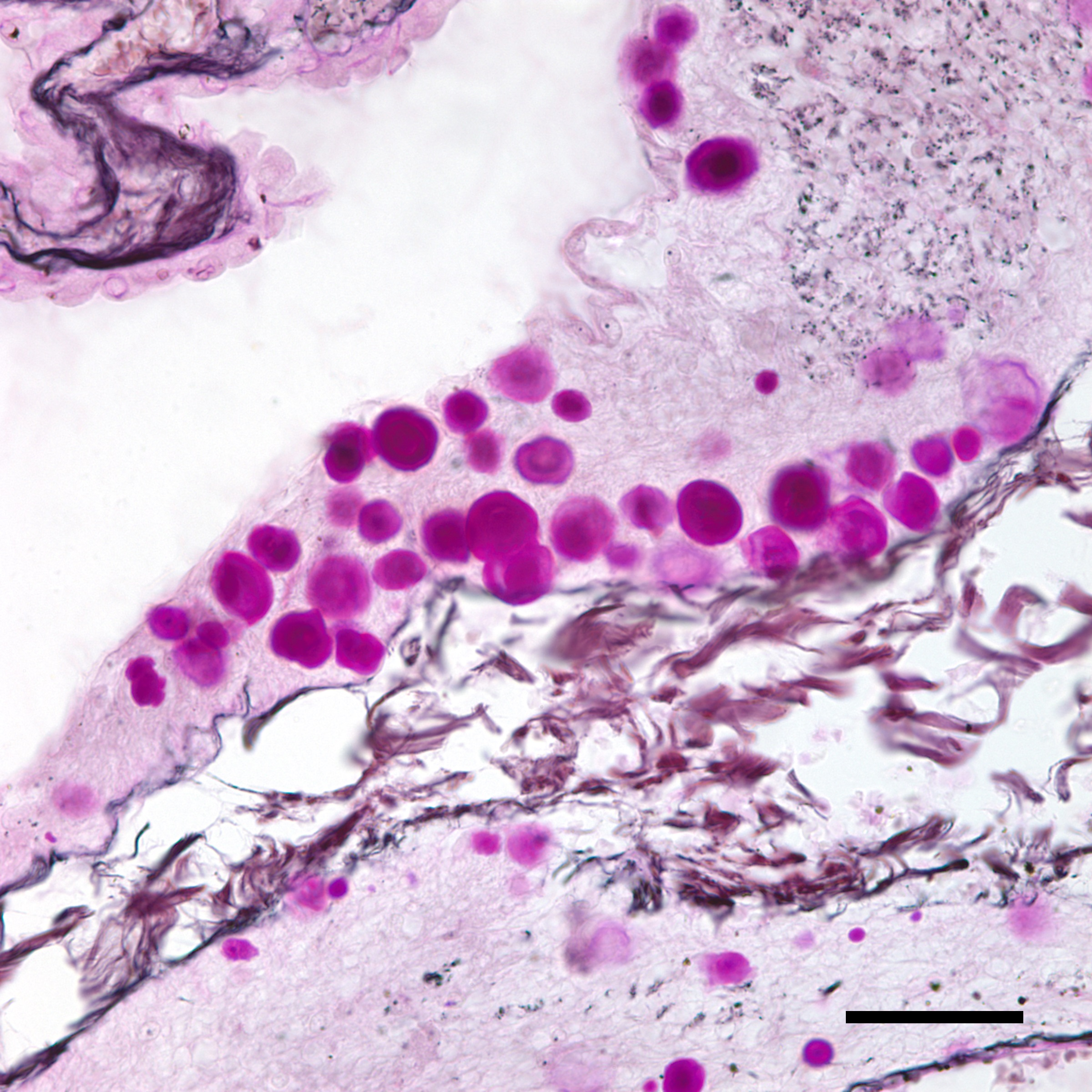
Micrograph of corpora amylacea (purple spheres) in the brain of a person with Alzheimer's disease. Combined Periodic acid-Schiff and silver stains. Bar = 50 microns (0.05 millimeters).

Corpora amylacea (CA) (from the Latin meaning "starch-like bodies") is a general term for small hyaline masses found in the prostate gland, nervous system, lung, and sometimes in other organs of the body. Corpora amylacea increase in number and size with advancing age, although this increase varies from person to person. In the nervous system, they are particularly abundant in certain neurodegenerative diseases. While their significance is largely unknown, some researchers have suggested that they may play a role in the clearance of debris.

== Locations ==
The composition and appearance of corpora amylacea can differ in different organs. In the prostate gland, where they are also known as prostatic concretions, corpora amylacea are rich in aggregated protein that has many of the features of amyloid, whereas those in the central nervous system are generally smaller and do not contain amyloid. Corpora amylacea in the central nervous system occur in the foot processes of astrocytes, and they are usually present beneath the pia mater, in the tissues surrounding the ventricles, and around blood vessels. They have been proposed to be part of a family of polyglucosan diseases, in which polymers of glucose collect to form abnormal structures known as polyglucosan bodies. Polyglucosan bodies bearing at least partial resemblance to human corpora amylacea have been observed in various nonhuman species.

== Function ==
While their significance is largely unknown, some researchers have suggested that corpora amylacea play a role in the clearance of debris.

== Additional images ==
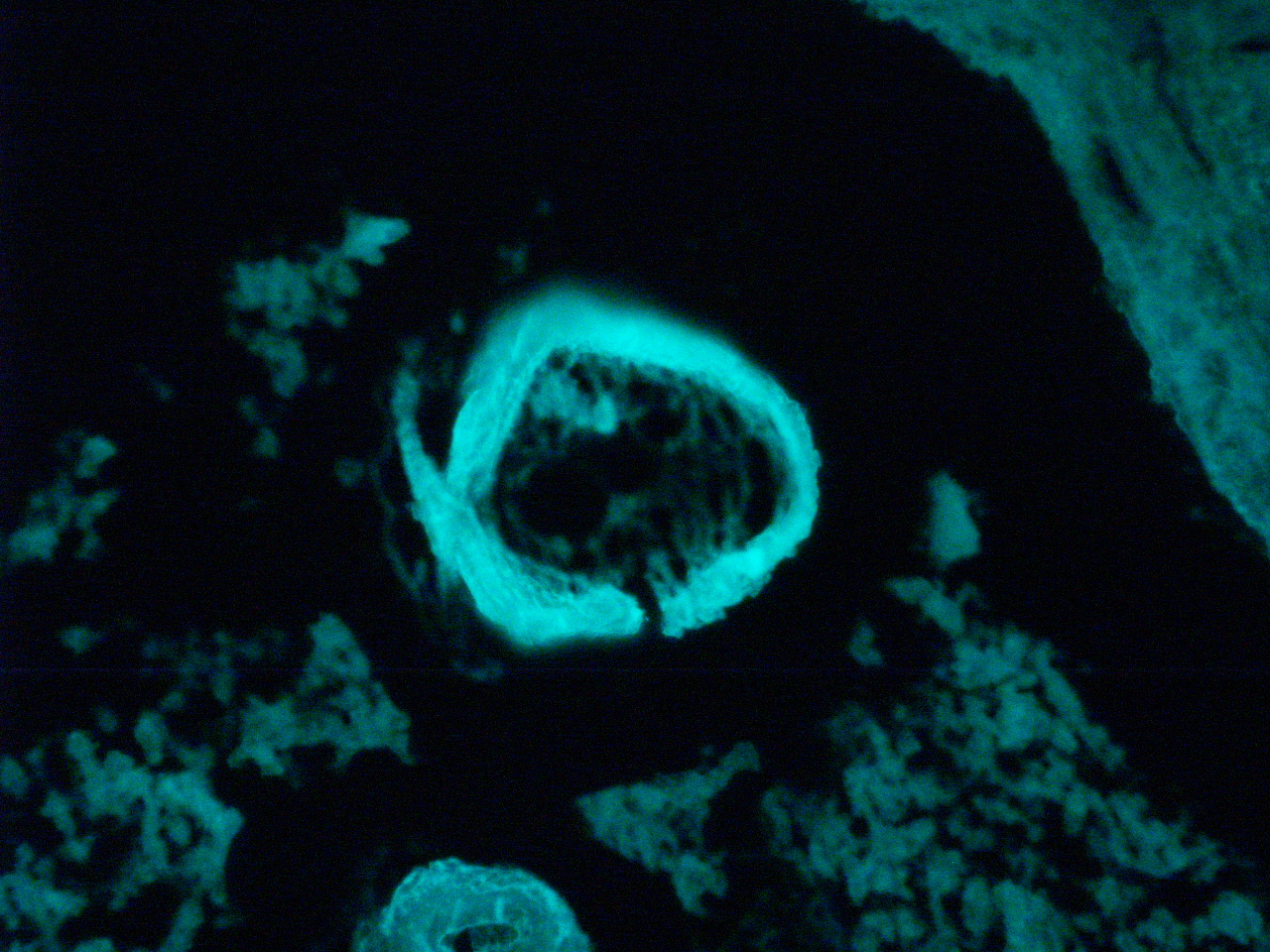
Natural luminescence of corpora amylacea in the lumen of the prostate in ultraviolet light

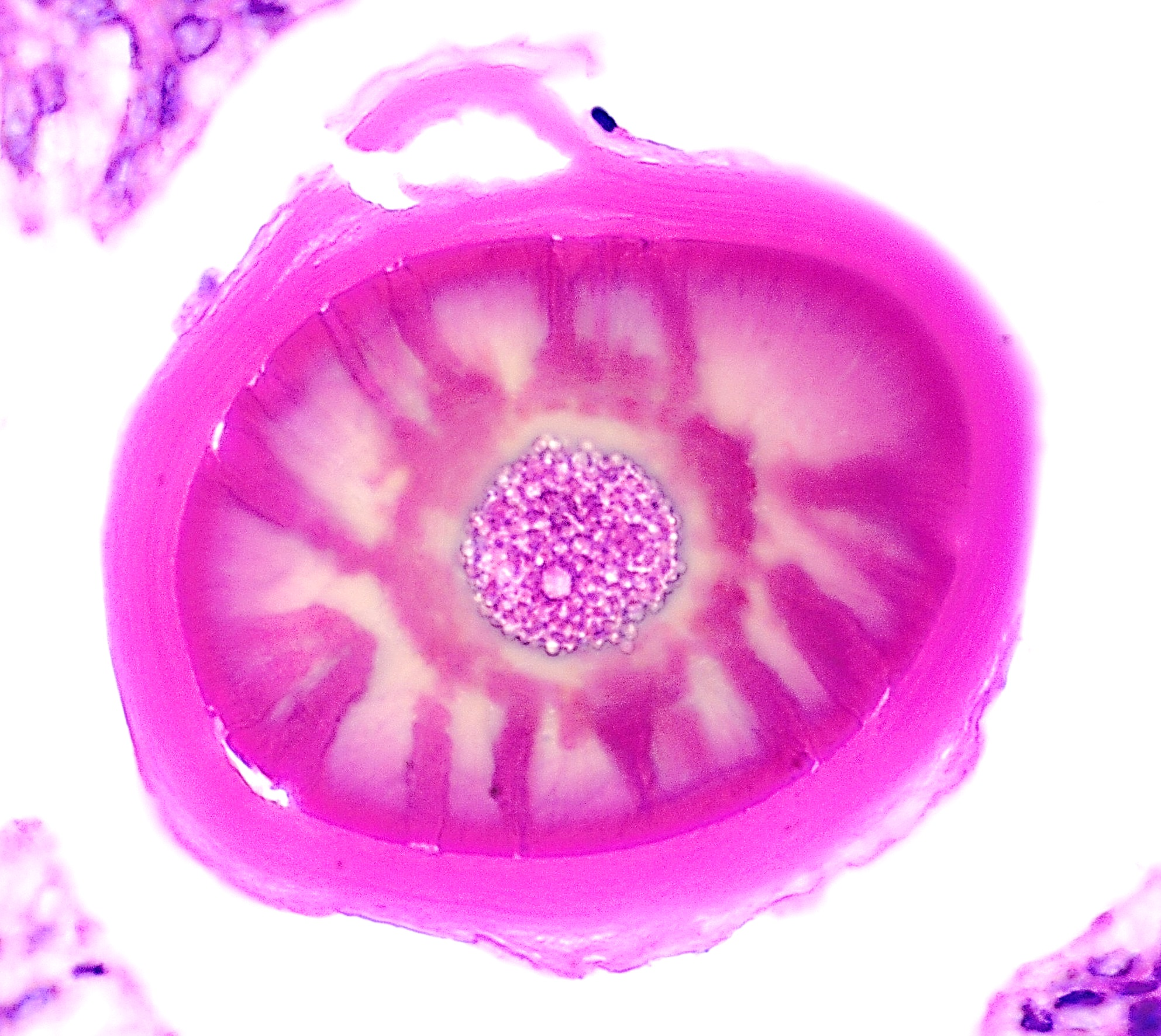
Histology of a multilayered corpus amylaceous of the prostate.
