= Pudendal venous plexus =

Venous plexus in the human torso

Details

Identifiers
- Latin: plexus pudendalis

The pudendal venous plexus (vesicoprostatic plexus) lies behind the arcuate pubic ligament and the lower part of the pubic symphysis, and in front of the bladder and prostate. Its chief tributary is the deep dorsal vein of the penis, but it also receives branches from the front of the bladder and prostate. It communicates with the vesical venous plexus and with the internal pudendal vein and drains into the vesical and hypogastric veins.

== See also ==
- Prostatic venous plexus
