= Acinus =

Multi-lobed biological cell structure

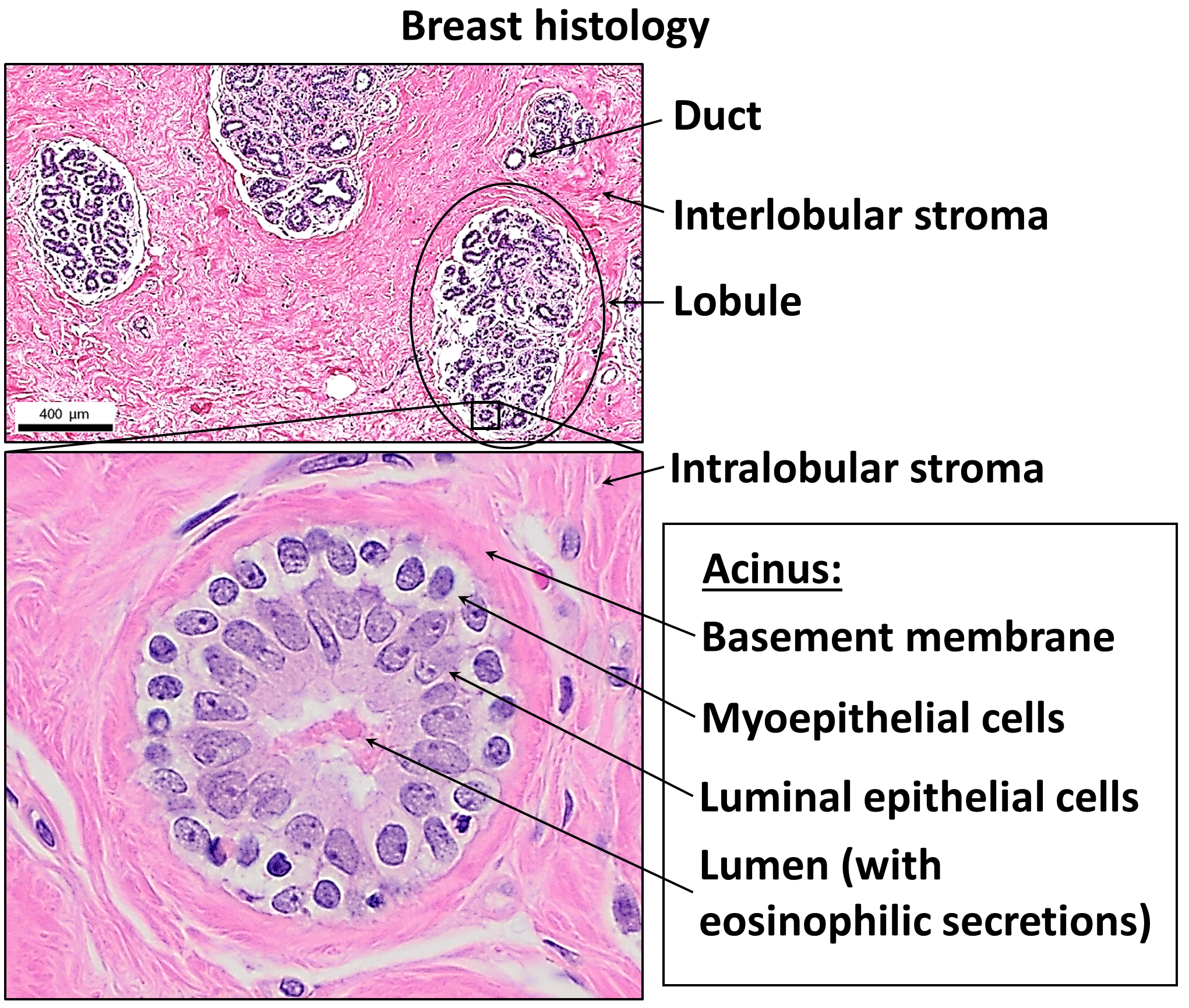
- Normal histology of the breast, including an acinus in lower image. The terminal duct connected to the magnified acinus is not within this microsection.

- Centroacinar cells

Identifiers
- TH: H2.00.02.0.03050

An acinus (/ˈæsɪnəs/; pl.: acini; adjective, acinar /ˈæsɪnər/ or acinous) refers to any cluster of cells that resembles a many-lobed "berry", such as a raspberry (acinus is Latin for "berry"). The berry-shaped termination of an exocrine gland, where the secretion is produced, is acinar in form, as is the alveolar sac containing multiple alveoli in the lungs.

== Exocrine glands ==
Acinar exocrine glands are found in many organs, including:

- the stomach
- the sebaceous gland of the scalp
- the salivary glands of the tongue
- the liver
- the lacrimal glands
- the mammary glands
- the pancreas
- the bulbourethral (Cowper's) glands

The thyroid follicles can also be considered of acinar formation but in this case the follicles, being part of an endocrine gland, act as a hormonal deposit rather than to facilitate secretion.
Mucous acini usually stain pale, while serous acini usually stain dark.

== Lungs ==
The end of the terminal bronchioles in the lungs mark the beginning of a pulmonary acinus that includes the respiratory bronchioles, alveolar ducts, alveolar sacs, and alveoli.

== See also ==
- Alveolar gland
- Intercalated duct
