= Apocrine =

Classification of secretion of exocrine glands

Exocrine secretion
Merocrine or eccrine – by exocytosis
Apocrine – by membrane budding (loss of cytoplasm)
Holocrine – by membrane rupture

Apocrine (/ˈæpəkrɪn/) is a term used to classify the mode of secretion of exocrine glands. In apocrine secretion, secretory cells accumulate material at their apical ends, often forming blebs or "snouts", and this material then buds off from the cells, forming extracellular vesicles. The secretory cells therefore lose part of their cytoplasm in the process of secretion.

An example of true apocrine glands is the mammary glands, responsible for secreting breast milk. Apocrine glands are also found in the anogenital region and axillae.

Apocrine secretion is less damaging to the gland than holocrine secretion (which destroys a cell) but more damaging than merocrine secretion (exocytosis).

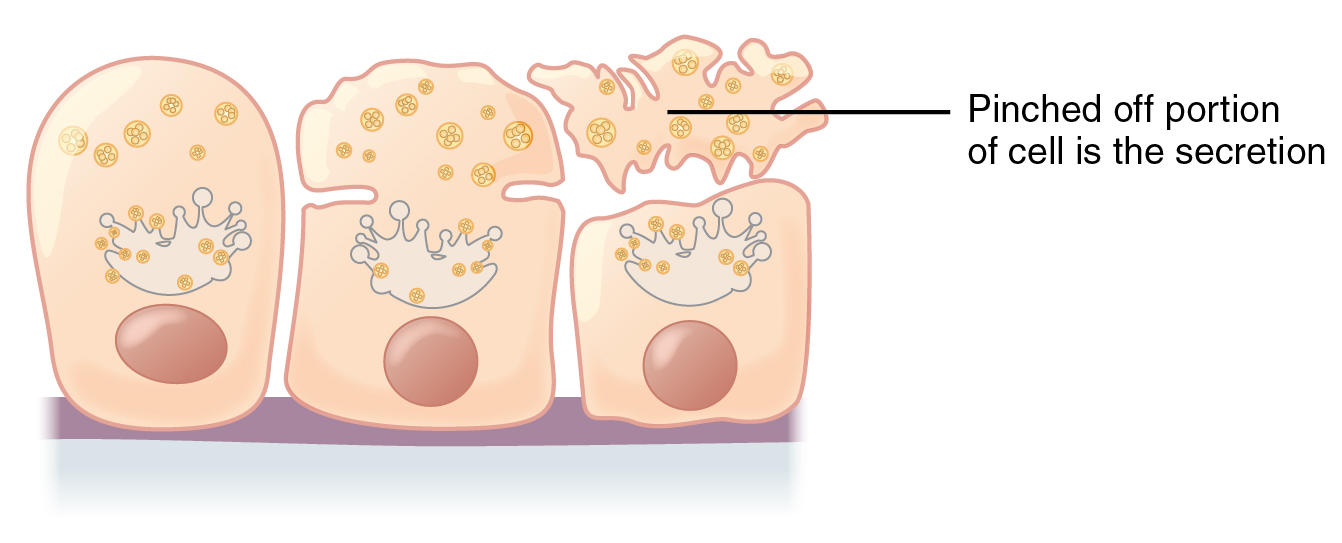
Apocrine secretion

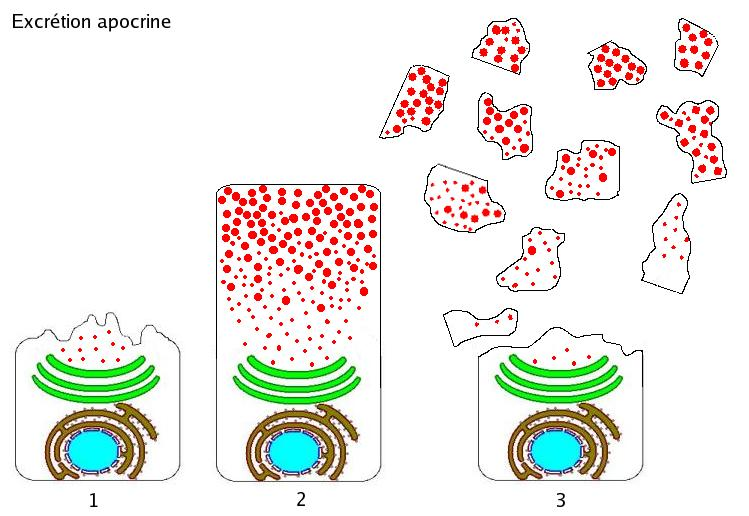
Apocrine gland

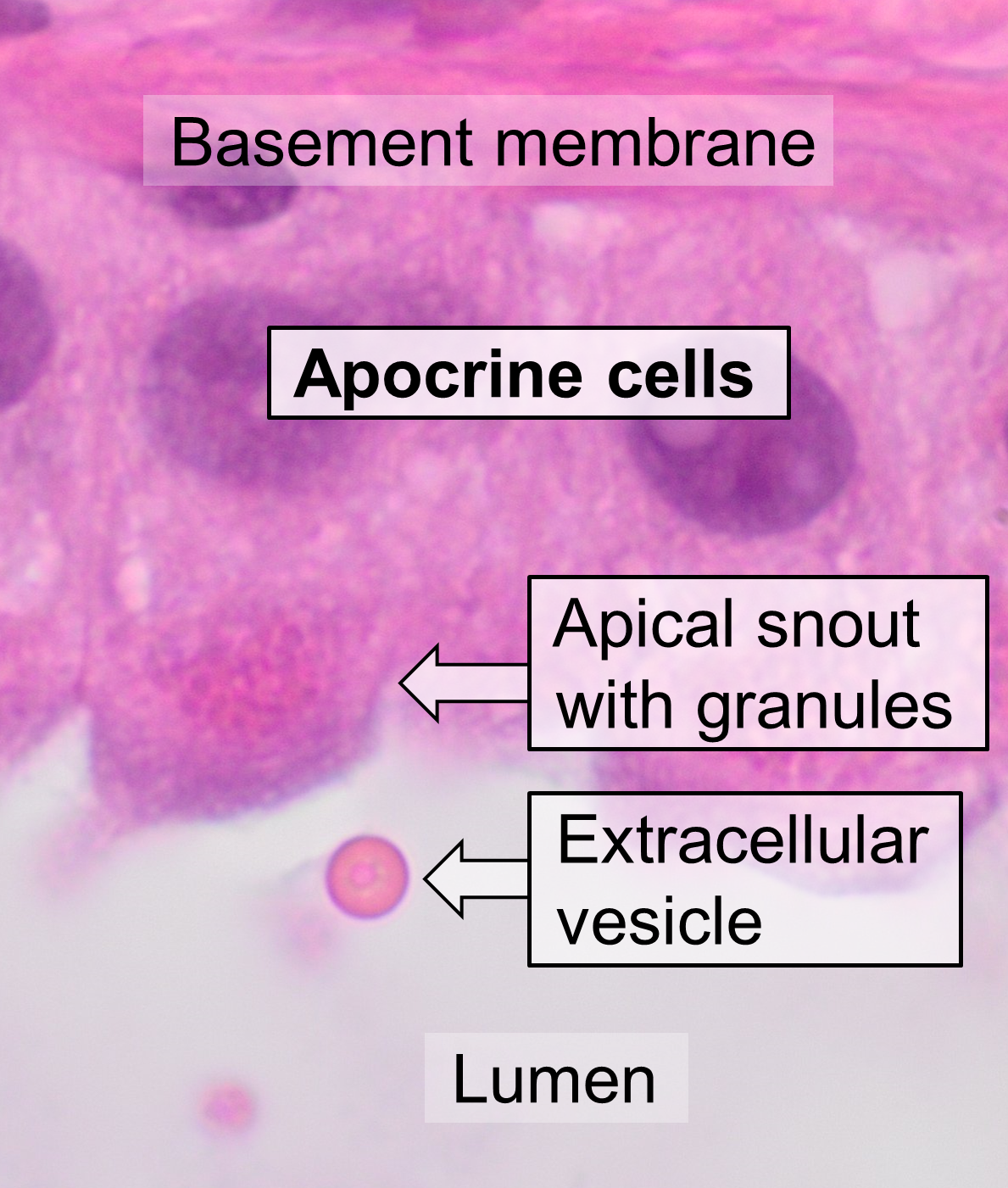
Histology of apocrine cells, H&E stain.

== Apocrine metaplasia ==
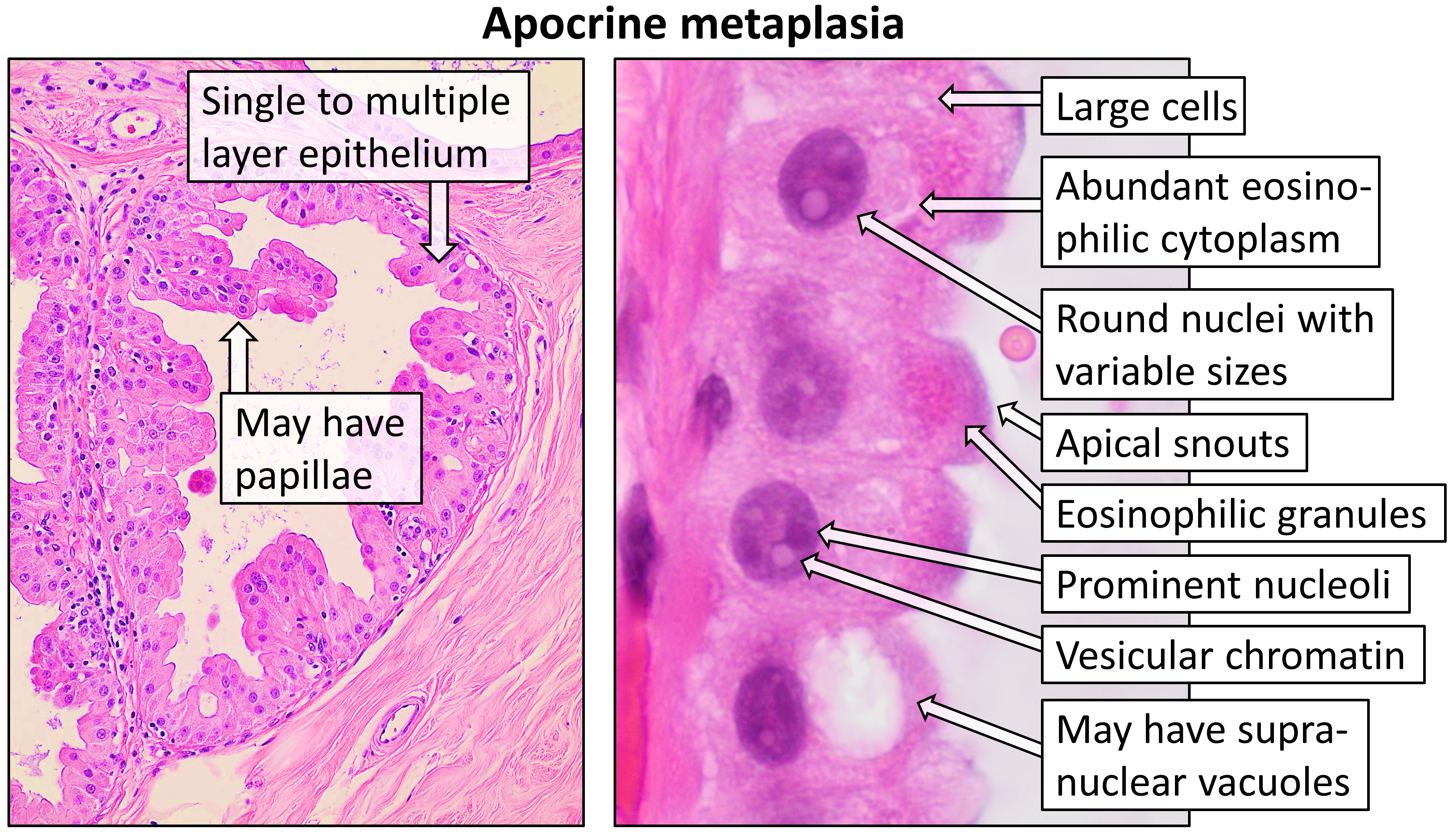
Micrograph showing apocrine metaplasia of the breast with typical features, including apical snouts with eosinophilic granules. H&E stain.

Apocrine metaplasia is a reversible transformation (metaplasia) of cells to an apocrine phenotype. It is common in the breast in the context of fibrocystic change. It is seen in women mostly over the age of 50 years. Metaplasia happens when there is an irritation to the breast (breast cyst). Apocrine-like cells form in a lining of developing microcysts, due to the pressure buildup within the lumen. The pressure build-up is caused by secretions. Such metaplasia represents an exception to the common rule of metaplasia's increasing the risk for developing cancer, in that apocrine metaplasia doesn't increase the possibility of developing breast cancer. Metaplastic apocrine cells belong to the category of oncocytes, which are a group characterized by abundant acidophilic, granular cytoplasm (from the Greek root onco-, which means mass, bulk).

== Apocrine ductal carcinoma in situ ==
Apocrine ductal carcinoma in situ (ACDIS) is a very rare breast carcinoma which is regarded as a variant of the ductal carcinoma in situ breast tumors. ACDIS tumors have microscopic histopathology features that are similar to pure apocrine carcinoma of the breast tumors but differ from them in that they are completely localized, i.e. have not invaded nearby tissues or metastasized to distant tissues.

== Apocrine carcinoma ==
Apocrine carcinoma is a very rare form of female breast cancer. The rate of incidence varies from 0.5 to 4%. Cytologically, the cells of apocrine carcinoma are relatively large, granular, and it has a prominent eosinophilic cytoplasm. When apocrine carcinoma is tested as a “triple negative", it means that the cells of the patient cannot express the estrogen receptor, progesterone receptor, or HER2 receptor.
