= Alveolar gland =

Glands with a saclike secretory portion

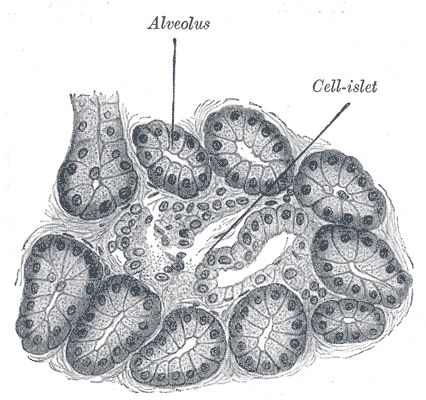
- Section of pancreas of dog. X 250.

Identifiers
- TH: H2.00.02.0.03028

Alveolar glands, also called saccular glands, are glands with a saclike secretory portion, in contrast with tubular glands. They typically have an enlarged lumen (cavity), hence the name: they have a shape similar to alveoli, the very small air sacs in the lungs.

Some sources draw a clear distinction between acinar and alveolar glands, based upon the size of the lumen. A further complication in the case of the alveolar glands may occur in the form of still smaller saccular diverticuli growing out from the main sacculi.

The term "racemose gland" is used to describe a "compound alveolar gland" or "compound acinar gland."

Branched alveolar glands are classified as follows:

Type	Description	Location
simple branched acinar		thyroid glands
tubuloalveolar or tubulo-alveolar or tubulo-acinar or compound tubulo-acinar or compound tubuloalveolar	glands that start out as simple branched tubular, and branch further to terminate in alveoli	salivary glands, esophagus mammary glands

== Additional images ==
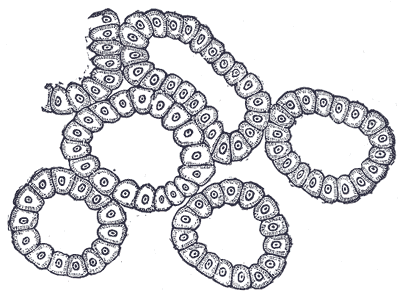
Alveoli of lacrimal gland.

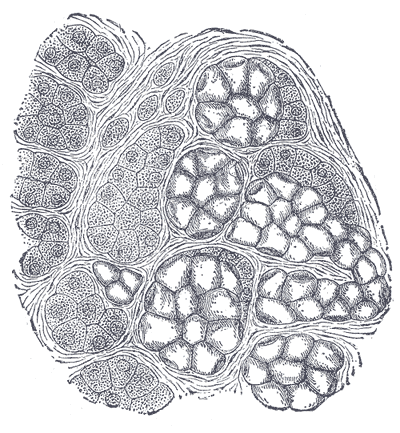
Human submaxillary gland. At the right is a group of mucous alveoli, at the left a group of serous alveoli.

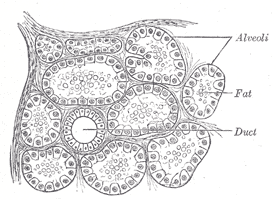
Section of portion of breast tissue.

== See also ==
- Acinus
