= Vesical veins =

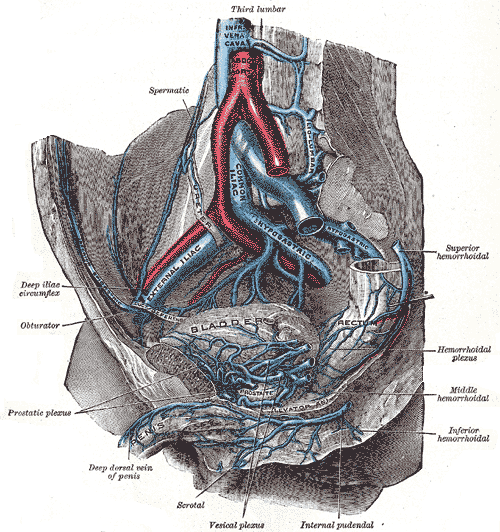
- The veins of the right half of the male pelvis.

Details
- Drains from: Urinary bladder
- Source: Vesical venous plexus
- Drains to: Internal iliac vein
- Artery: Superior vesical artery, inferior vesical artery

Identifiers
- Latin: venae vesicales
- TA98: A12.3.10.011
- TA2: 5038
- FMA: 70911

The vesical veins are veins in the pelvis that drain blood from the urinary bladder. The vesical veins receive blood from the vesical venous plexus and are tributaries of the internal iliac veins.
