= Tubular gland =

Secretary glands with tube-like shape

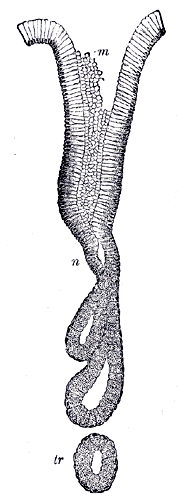
- A pyloric gland, from a section of the dog's stomach. m. Mouth. n. Neck. tr. A deep portion of a tubule cut transversely.

Details

Identifiers
- Latin: glandula tubulosa
- TH: H2.00.02.0.03021

Tubular glands are glands with a tube-like shape throughout their length, in contrast with alveolar glands, which have a saclike secretory portion.

Tubular glands are further classified as one of the following types:

Type	Description	Location
simple tubular or simple straight tubular or straight tubular	the gland is a uniform tube	Small intestine (Crypts of Lieberkühn), uterine glands
coiled tubular or simple coiled tubular	the gland is coiled without losing its tubular form	sweat glands
simple branched tubular or compound tubular	branching occurs in the tubes	pyloric glands of stomach

== See also ==
- skin - glands in skin structure
- hair follicles - for hair growth

== Additional images ==
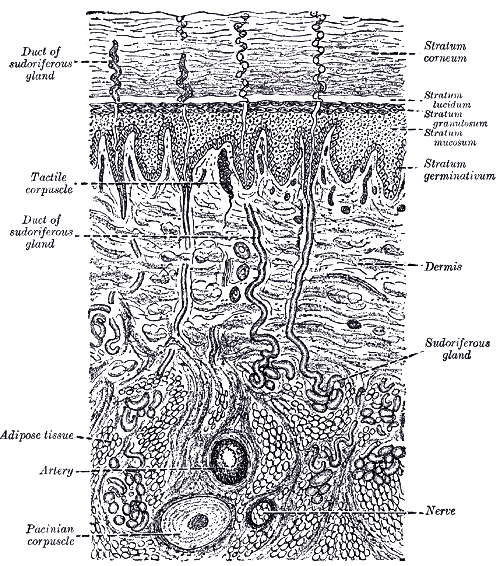
A diagrammatic sectional view of the skin (magnified).

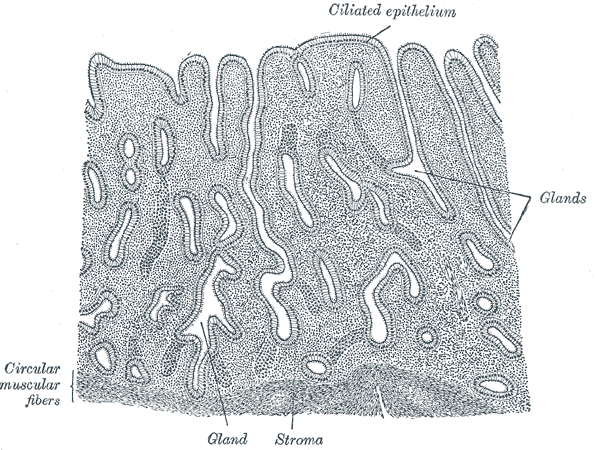
Vertical section of mucous membrane of human uterus.

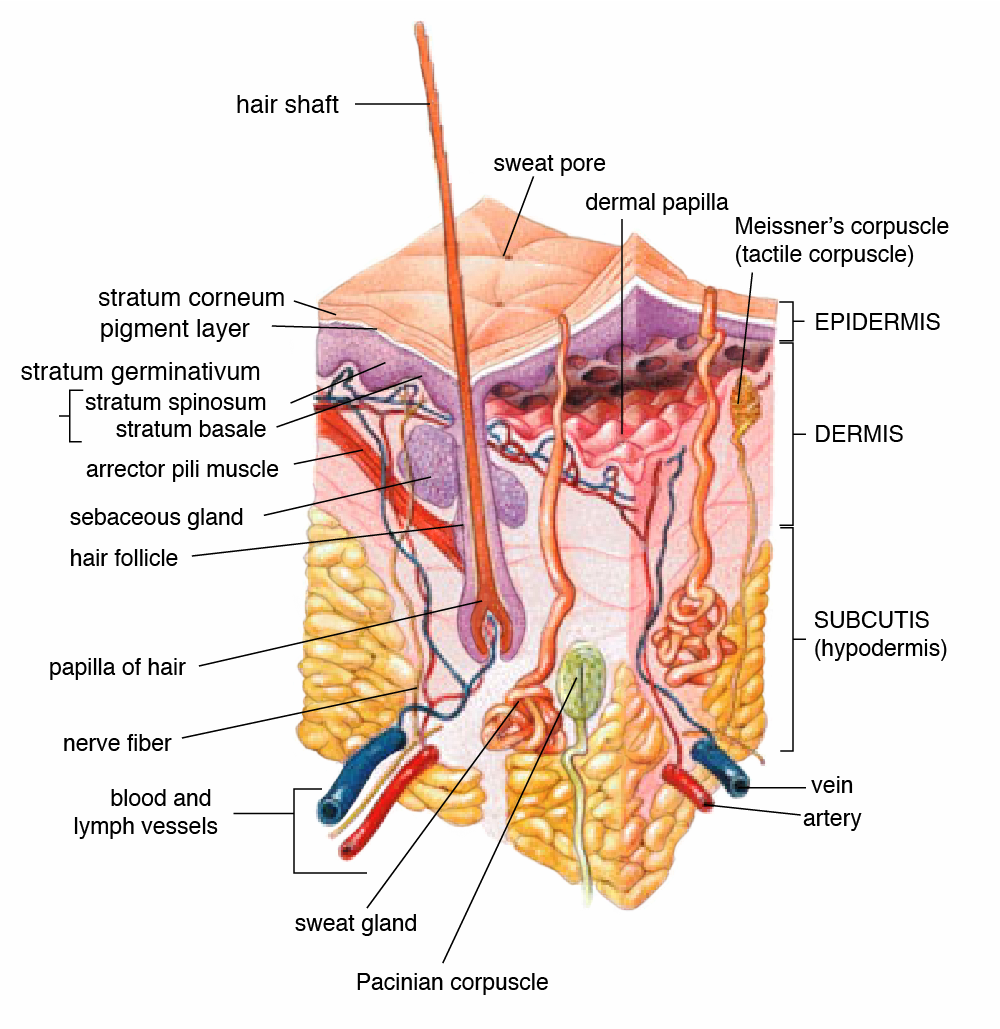
Skin
