= Salivary gland disease =

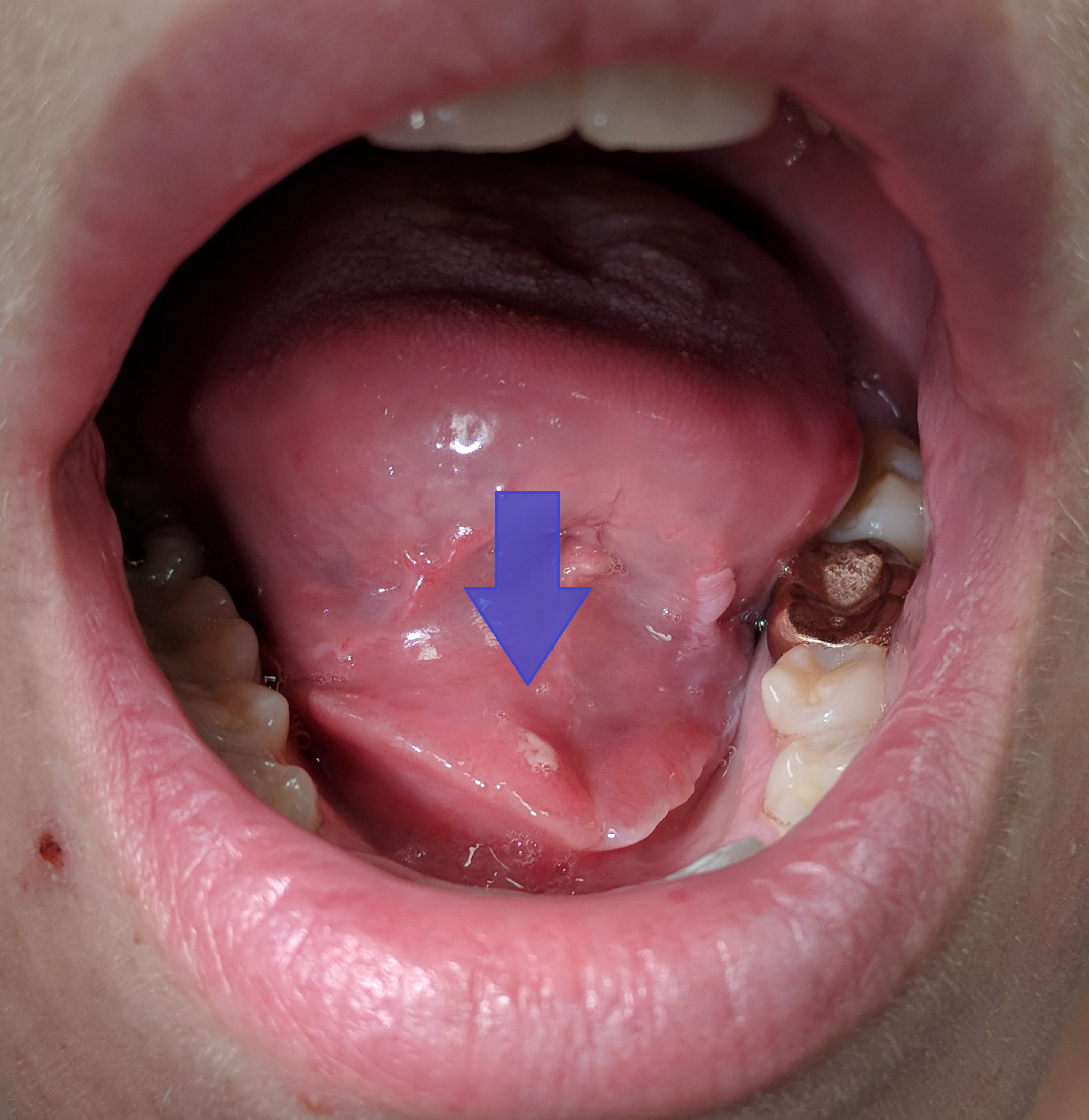
- Blockage of the submandibular gland by a salivary stone with subsequent infection. Arrow marks pus coming out of the opening of the submandibular gland
- Specialty: Gastroenterology, oral and maxillofacial surgery

Salivary gland diseases (SGDs) are multiple and varied in cause. There are three paired major salivary glands in humans: the parotid glands, the submandibular glands, and the sublingual glands. There are also about 800–1,000 minor salivary glands in the mucosa of the mouth. The parotid glands are in front of the ears, one on side, and secrete mostly serous saliva, via the parotid ducts (Stenson ducts), into the mouth, usually opening roughly opposite the second upper molars. The submandibular gland is medial to the angle of the mandible, and it drains its mixture of serous and mucous saliva via the submandibular duct (Wharton duct) into the mouth, usually opening in a punctum in the floor of mouth. The sublingual gland is below the tongue, on the floor of the mouth; it drains its mostly mucous saliva into the mouth via about 8–20 ducts, which open along the plica sublingualis, a fold of tissue under the tongue.

The function of the salivary glands is to secrete saliva, which has a lubricating function, which protects the mucosa of the mouth during eating and speaking. Saliva also contains digestive enzymes (e.g. salivary amylase), has antimicrobial action, and acts as a buffer. Salivary-gland dysfunction occurs when salivary rates are reduced; this can cause xerostomia (dry mouth).

Some disorders affecting the salivary glands are listed below. Some are more common than others, and they are considered according to a surgical sieve; but this list is not exhaustive. Sialadenitis is inflammation of a salivary gland, usually caused by infections, although there are other, less common causes of inflammation, such as irradiation, allergic reactions, and trauma.

== Congenital ==
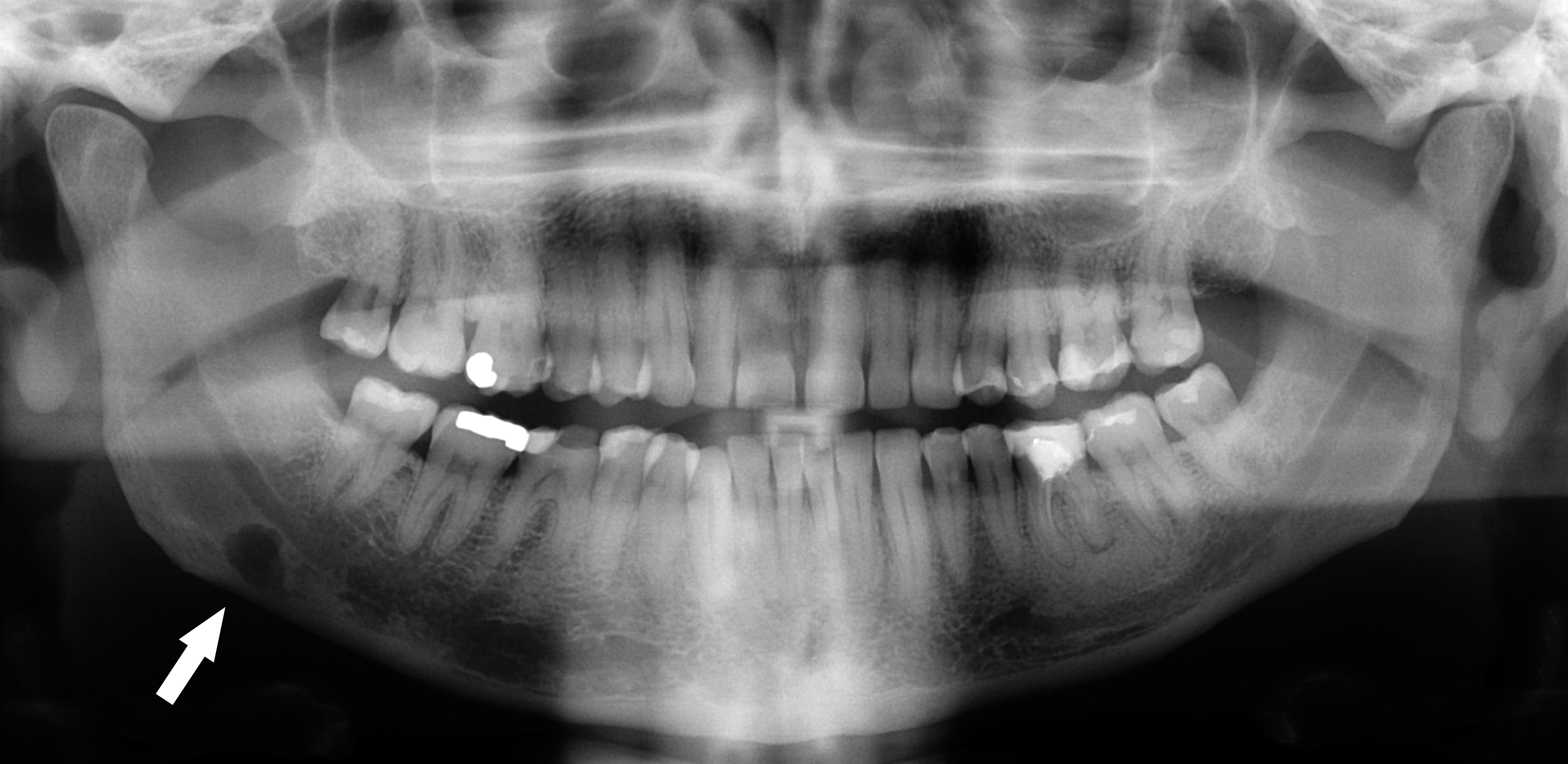
Stafne defect

Congenital disorders of the salivary glands are rare. They include:

- Aplasia
- Atresia
- Ectopic salivary gland tissue
- Stafne defect - an uncommon condition which some consider to be an anatomic variant rather than a true disease. It is thought to be created by an ectopic portion of salivary gland tissue which causes the bone of the mandible to remodel around the tissue, creating an apparent cyst like radiolucent area on radiographs. Classically, this lesion is discovered as a chance finding, since it causes no symptoms. It appears below the inferior alveolar nerve canal in the posterior region of the mandible.

== Acquired ==
=== Dysfunction ===
Salivary gland dysfunction affects the flow, amount, or quality of saliva produced. A reduced salivation is termed hyposalivation. Hyposalivation often results in a dry mouth condition called xerostomia, and this can cause tooth decay due to the loss of the protective properties of saliva. In addition, the results of a study have suggested that hyposalivation could lead to acute respiratory infection. There are two potential reasons for increasing the incidence rate of this infection. First, reduced saliva secretion may impair the oral and airway mucosal surface as a physical barrier, which consequently enhances the adhesion and colonization of viruses. Second, this reduction may also impair the secretion of antimicrobial proteins and peptides. In saliva, there are many antiviral proteins and peptides, some of which can inhibit replication of viruses, especially coronavirus; these salivary proteins may also protect against the severe acute respiratory syndrome coronavirus 2 (SARS-CoV-2). Therefore, hyposalivation may be a risk factor for acute respiratory infection, including (COVID-19). However, further investigations are crucial to prove this hypothesis.

Hypersalivation is the overproduction of saliva and has many causes.

=== Vascular ===
- Necrotizing sialometaplasia is a lesion that usually arises from a minor salivary gland on the palate. It is thought to be due to vascular infarction of the salivary gland lobules. It is often mistaken for oral cancer, but the lesion is not neoplastic.

=== Infective ===
Infections involving the salivary glands can be viral or bacterial (or rarely fungal).

- Mumps is the most common viral sialadenitis. It usually occurs in children and involves pain in front of the ear, swelling of the parotid, fever, chills, and headaches.
- Bacterial sialadenitis is usually caused by ascending organisms from the mouth. Risk factors include reduced salivary flow.
- Human immunodeficiency virus-associated salivary gland disease (HIV-SGD).

=== Traumatic ===
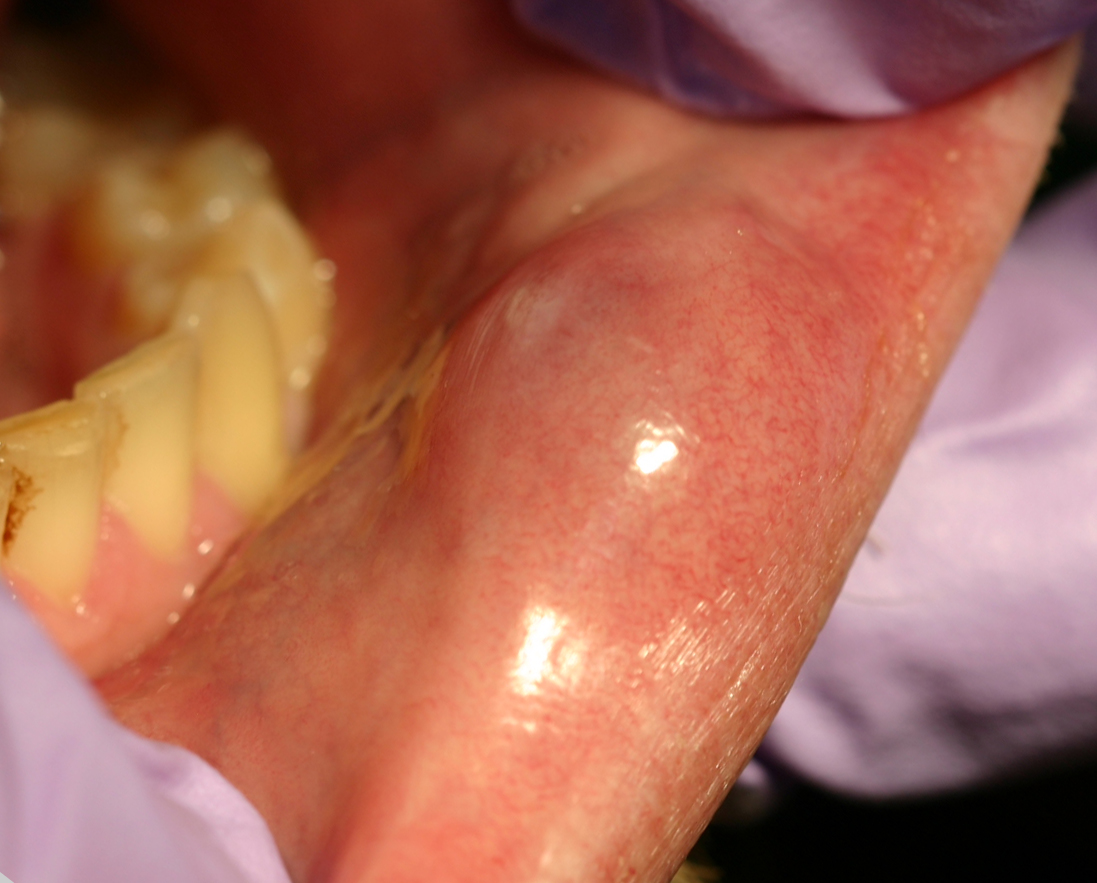
Oral mucocele a mucous cyst

- Oral mucoceles are common, and are caused by rupture of a salivary gland duct and spillage of mucin into the surrounding tissues. Usually, they are caused by trauma. Classically, a mucocele is bluish and fluctuant, and most commonly occurs on the lower lip.
- Ranula is a mucocele under the tongue. Ranulas may be larger than mucoceles at other sites; they are usually associated with the sublingual gland, and less often they arise from the submandibular gland or a minor salivary gland. Rarely, a ranula may descend into the neck rather than the mouth (plunging ranula). If small, the ranula may be left alone; if it is larger and causing symptoms, excision of the sublingual gland may be indicated.
- Nicotinic stomatitis is whitening of the hard palate by hyperkeratosis caused by the heat from smoking or from drinking hot liquids. This irritation also causes inflammation of the duct openings of the minor salivary glands of the palate, and they become dilated. This manifests as red patches or spots on a white background.

=== Autoimmune ===
- Sjögren's syndrome
- Graft-versus-host disease

=== Inflammatory ===
- Post-irradiation sialadenitis
- Sarcoidosis—there may be parotitis alone or uveoparotitis (inflammation of both the parotid and the uvea of the eyes), which occurs in Heerfordt's syndrome.
- Cheilitis glandularis—This is inflammation of the minor salivary glands, usually in the lower lip, eversion and swelling of the lip.
- Chronic sclerosing sialadenitis is a salivary gland manifestation of IgG4-related disease.

=== Neurological ===
- Frey's syndrome

=== Neoplastic ===
- Salivary gland neoplasm
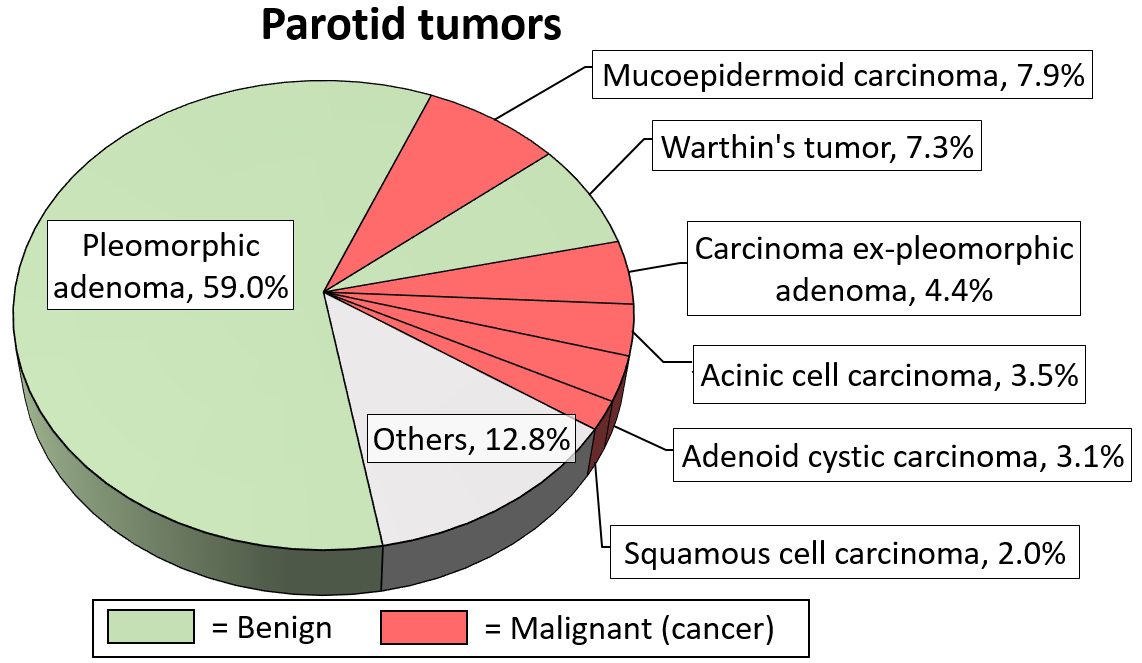
Relative incidence of parotid tumors.

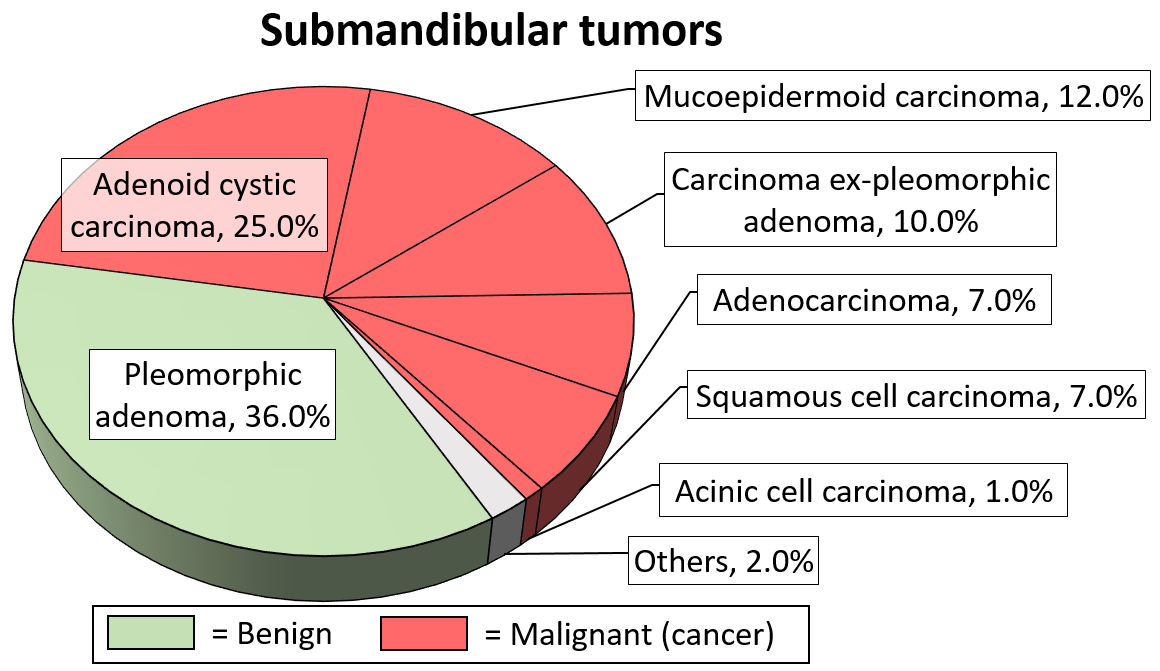
Relative incidence of submandibular tumors.

=== Diverticulum ===
A salivary diverticulum (plural diverticuli) is a small pouch or out-pocketing of the duct system of a major salivary gland. Such diverticuli typically cause pooling of saliva and recurrent sialadenitis, especially parotitis. A diverticulum may also cause a sialolith to form. The condition can be diagnosed by sialography. Affected individuals may "milk" the salivary gland to encourage flow of saliva through the duct.

=== Unknown ===
- Sialolithiasis - although several possibly coexisting factors have been suggested to be involved in the formation of salivary stones, including altered acidity of saliva, reduced salivary flow rate, abnormal calcium metabolism and abnormalities in the sphincter mechanism of the duct opening, the exact cause in many cases is unknown.
- Sialadenosis (sialosis) is an uncommon, non-inflammatory, non-neoplastic, recurrent swelling of the salivary glands. The cause is hypothesized to be abnormalities of neurosecretory control. It may be associated with alcoholism.
