= Sublingual papilla =

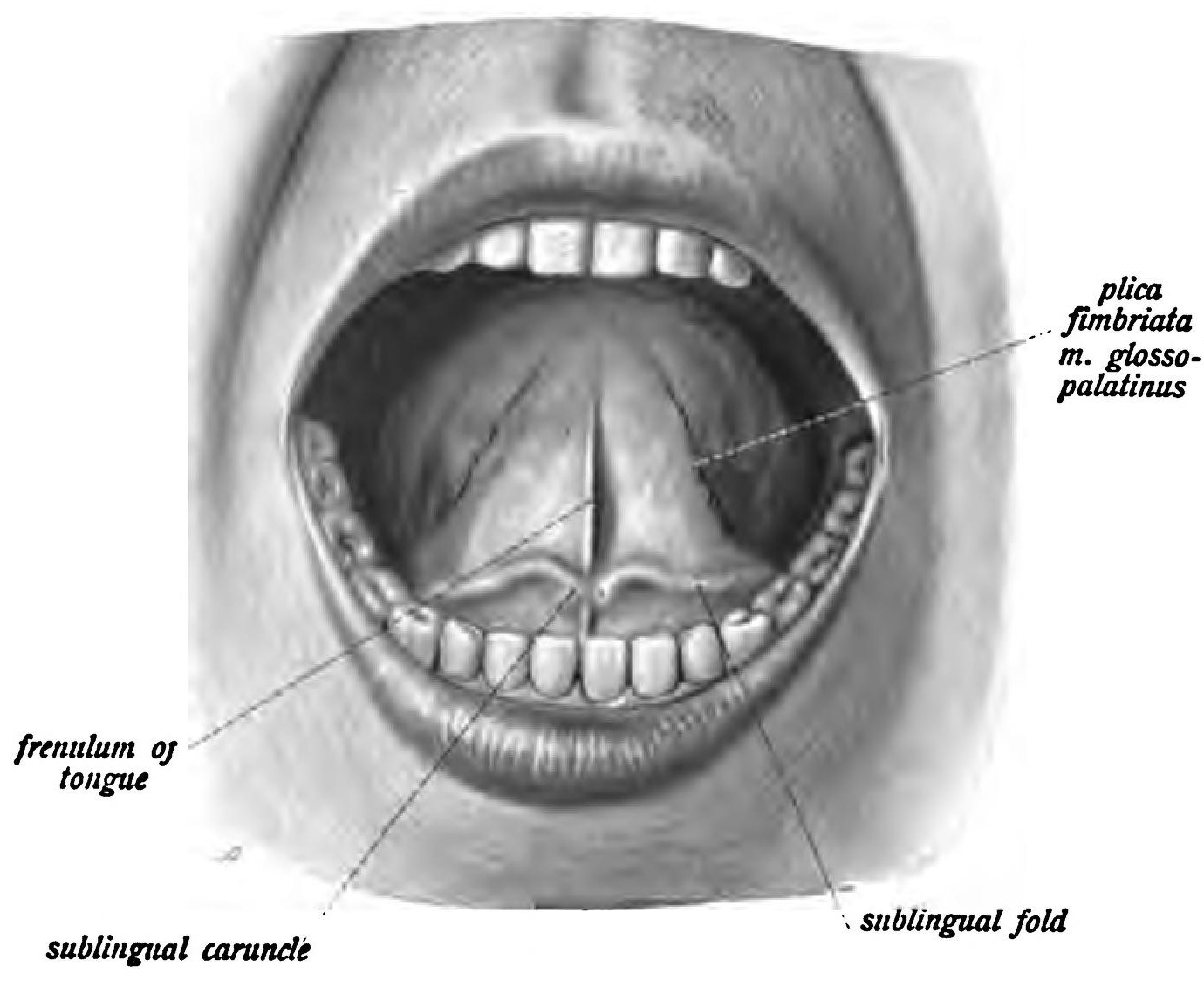
- The sublingual fold, as identified in this 1906 diagram

Details

Identifiers
- Latin: plica sublingualis
- TA98: A05.1.01.113
- TA2: 2789
- FMA: 54660

The sublingual papilla or sublingual fold is a small fold of soft tissue located on each side of the lingual frenulum. The sublingual papilla marks the site of the sublingual gland with its major sublingual duct and its minor sublingual ducts opening upon the papilla.

== Clinical significance ==
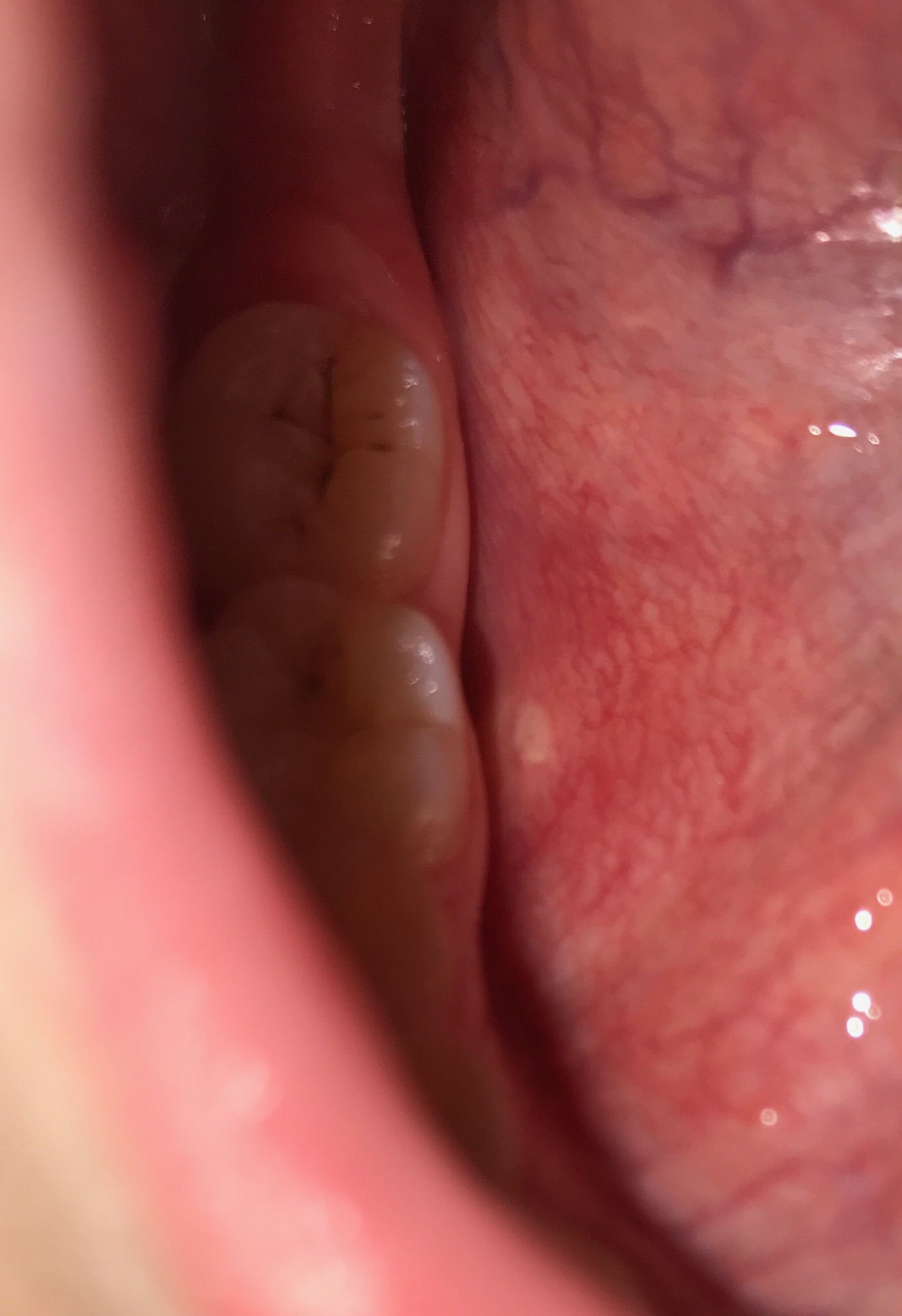
Mouth ulcer on the sublingual papilla

In cases of pathology, papillotomy procedures are undertaken for cases of obstructive salivary gland diseases. The appearance of papillae may be influenced by the underlying pathology. Based on the classification proposed by Anicin et al., papilla typology affects the duration of sialendoscope introduction and may influence the frequency of intraoperative complications of sialendoscopy.
