= Sialocele =

Localized cavity containing saliva

A sialocele is a localized, subcutaneous cavity containing saliva. It is caused by trauma (e.g. violence, accident or surgery) or infection. They most commonly develop about 8–14 days after injury.

They are a relatively common complication following surgery to the salivary glands, commonly parotidectomy (removal of the parotid gland). In this case the sialocele is the result of saliva draining out of remaining parotid tissue, and occurs about 5 to 10% of cases of superficial (partial) parotidectomy.

It is usually not painful, and a mild and self-limiting complication, and is managed by repeated aspiration (draining) of the swelling via a needle after the skin has been disinfected with an antibacterial. The fluid is usually a clear yellow, and contains amylase (in contrast to fluid from a seroma). Pressure dressings do not tend to be used. They are rarely chronic, however if persistent a surgical drain may be required. Botulinum toxin injections have also been used to manage this condition.

== See also ==
- Mucocele
- Ranula
