= Bartholin's duct =

Bartholin's duct may refer to:

- Major sublingual duct, the largest excretory duct of the sublingual gland in the mouth.
- Ducts of the Bartholin's gland in the vagina.
