= Stafne defect =

Depression of the jawbone

- Other names: Stafne's idiopathic bone cavity, Stafne bone cavity, Stafne bone cyst, lingual mandibular salivary gland depression, lingual mandibular cortical defect, latent bone cyst, and static bone cyst
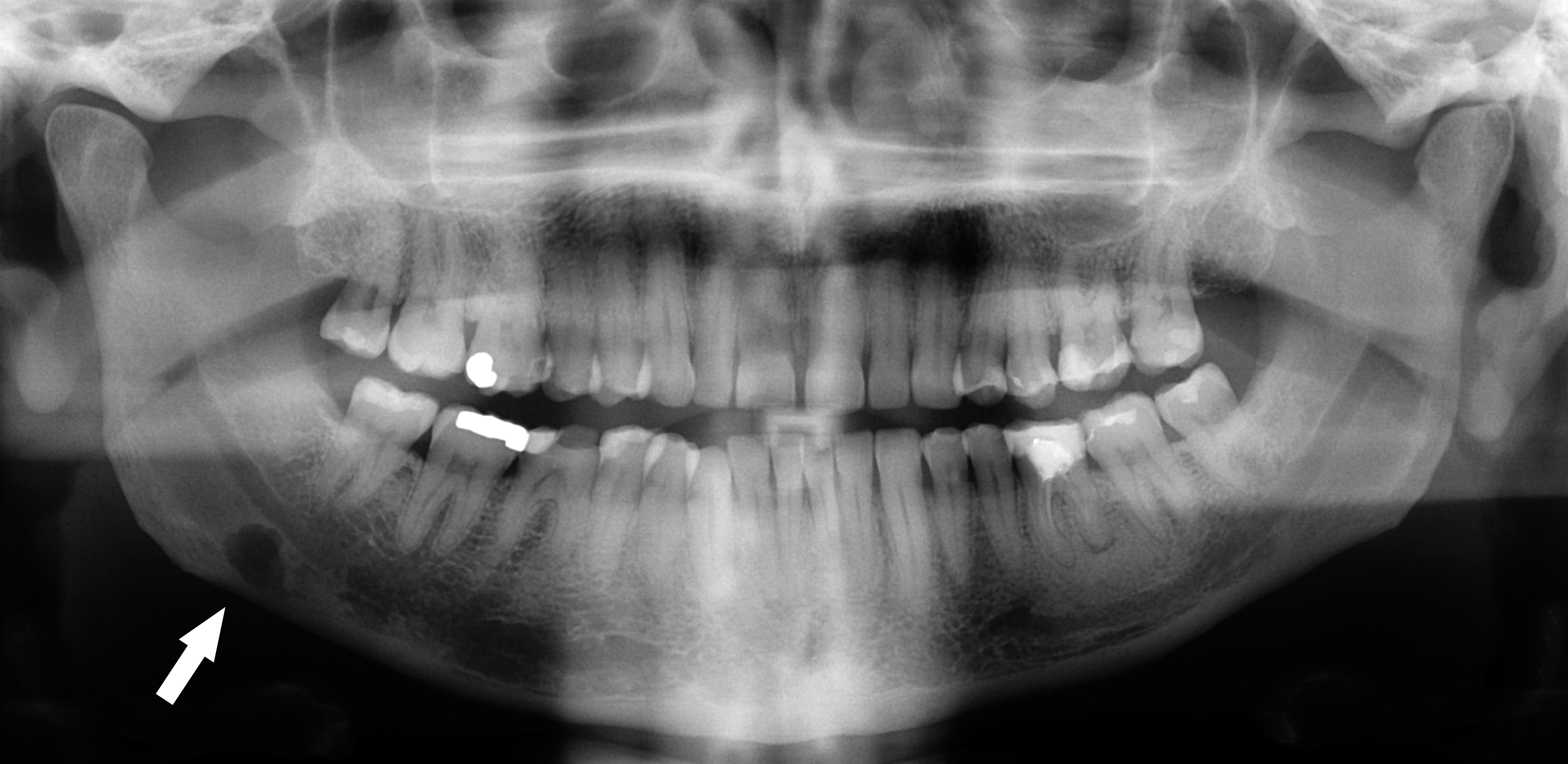
- Dental panoramic radiograph showing Stafne defect in the right mandible, below the inferior alveolar nerve canal (arrowed, appears on lower left of image). This x-ray was taken for an unrelated assessment of wisdom teeth, and the Stafne defect was a chance finding.

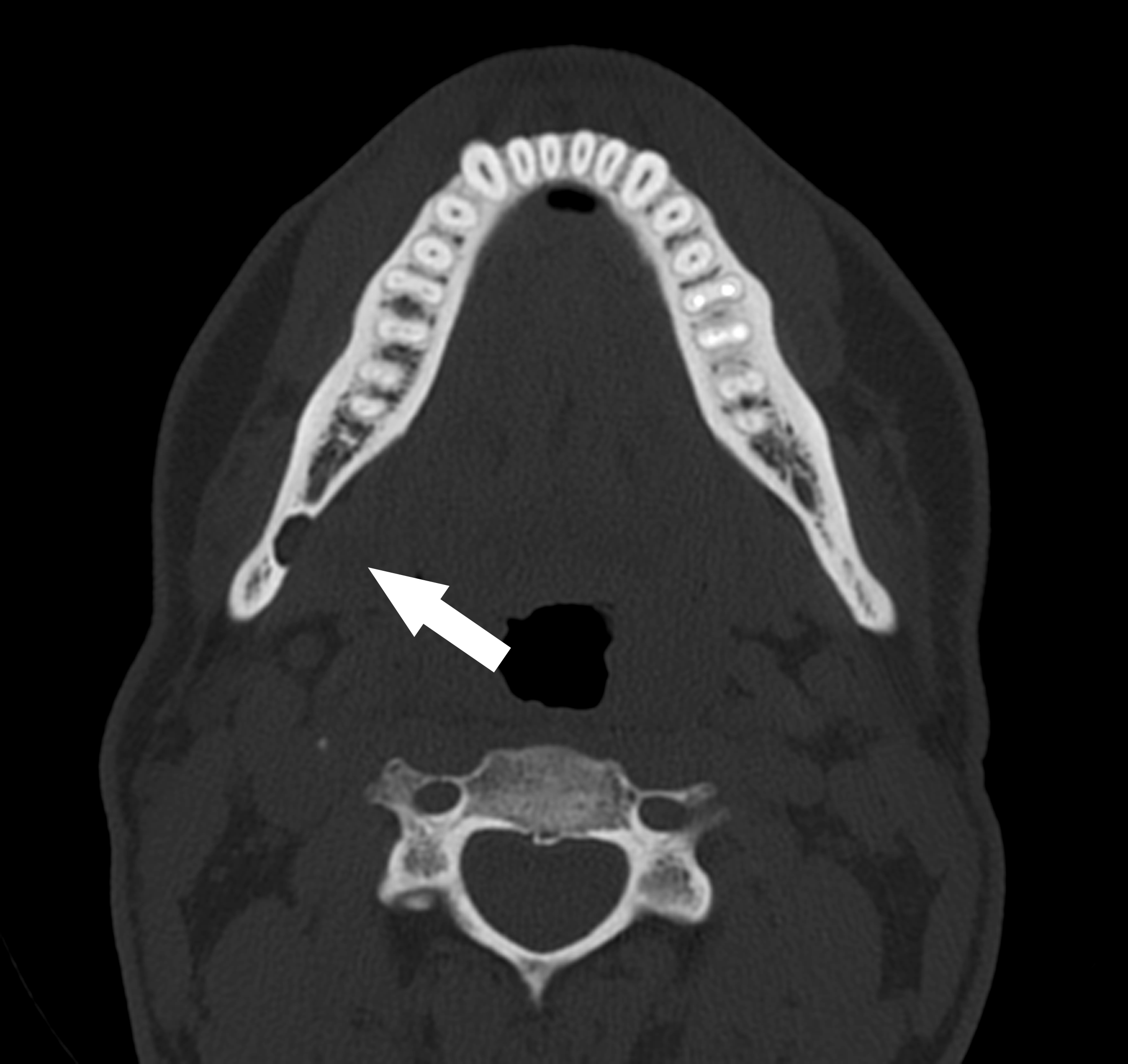
Axial computed tomograph of the same person. The Stafne defect appears as a well corticated 1 cm round defect in the medial cortex of the mandible in the right angle of the jaw (arrowed).

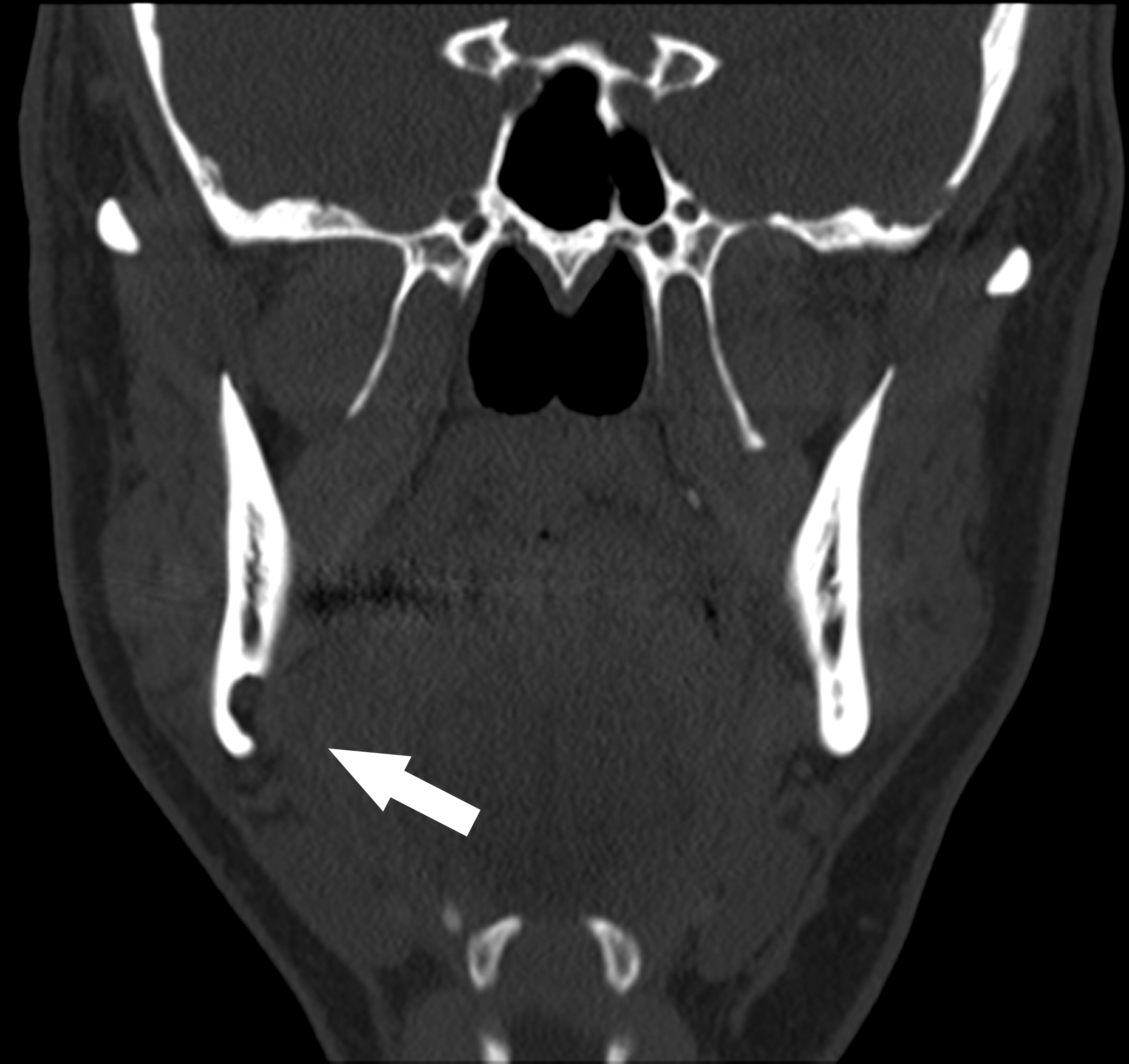
Coronal computed tomograph of the same person (Stafne defect arrowed)

The Stafne defect is a depression of the mandible (jawbone), most commonly located on the lingual surface (the side nearest the tongue). The Stafne defect is thought to be a normal anatomical variant, as the depression is created by ectopic salivary gland tissue associated with the submandibular gland and does not represent a pathologic lesion as such. This cavity is commonly observed on panoramic radiograph.

== Classification ==
It is a classed as a pseudocyst, since there is no epithelial lining or fluid content. This defect is usually considered with other cysts of the jaws, since it can be mistaken for such on a radiograph.

Two classification systems were proposed to categorize Stafne bone cavity based on its depth and content.

Various synonyms have been used to describe this bone cavity including Stafne bone defect, lingual cortical mandibular defect, lingual mandibular bone cavity and submandibular gland defect.

== Signs and symptoms ==
There are no symptoms, and no signs can be elicited on examination. Medical imaging such as traditional radiography or computed tomography is required to demonstrate the defect. Usually the defect is unilateral, but occasionally can be bilateral.

== Causes ==
It was originally proposed by Stafne that some parts of the submandibular gland could be trapped during mandibular ossification, causing well-circumscribed bony depression. This theory is supported by the observation that ectopic salivary glands are found in the cavity. Another hypothesis states that this bone cavity could result from the pressure exerted on the inner surface of the mandible due to the growth of sublingual or submandibular gland.

Rarely, the defect can be completely surrounded by bone, and this has been theorized to be the result of entrapment of embryonic salivary gland tissue within the bone. Similar, but rarer, defects may be present in the anterior portion of the lingual surface of the mandible. These are not termed Stafne defects which specifically refers to the posterior location. The anterior defects may be associated with the sublingual salivary gland.

== Diagnosis ==
Stafne's defect is usually discovered by chance during routine dental radiography. Radiographically, it is a well-circumscribed, monolocular, round, radiolucent defect, 1–3 cm in size, usually between the inferior alveolar nerve (IAN) and the inferior border of the posterior mandible between the molars and the angle of the jaw. It is one of the few radiolucent lesions that can occur below the IAN. The border is well corticated and it will have no effect on the surrounding structures. Computed tomography (CT) will show a shallow defect through the medial cortex of the mandible with a corticated rim and no soft tissue abnormalities, with the exception of a portion of the submandibular gland. Neoplasms, such as metastatic squamous cell carcinoma to the submandibular lymph nodes or a salivary gland tumour, could create a similar appearance but rarely have such well defined borders and can usually be palpated in the floor of the mouth or submandibular triangle of the neck as a hard mass. CT and clinical exam is typically sufficient to distinguish between this and a Stafne defect. The Stafne defect also tends to not increase in size or change in radiographic appearance over time (hence the term "static bone cyst"), and this can be used to help confirm the diagnosis. Tissue biopsy is not usually indicated, but if carried out, the histopathologic appearance is usually normal salivary gland tissue. Sometimes attempted biopsy of Stafne defects reveals an empty cavity (possibly because the gland was displaced at the time of biopsy), or other contents such as blood vessels, fat, lymphoid or connective tissues. Defects of the anterior lingual mandible may require biopsy for correct diagnosis at this unusual location. The radiolucent defect here may be superimposed on the lower anterior teeth and be mistaken for an odontogenic lesion. Sometimes the defect may interrupt the contour of the lower border of the mandible, and may be palpable. Sialography may be sometimes used to help demonstrate the salivary gland tissue within the bone.

== Treatment ==
No treatment is required, but neoplastic processes (metastatic malignancy to the submandibular lymph nodes and/or salivary gland tumours) should be ruled out. This is usually done with clinical exam and imaging. Very rarely, since the defect contains salivary gland tissue, salivary gland tumors can occur within an established defect but there is likely no difference in the risk of neoplasia in salivary gland tissue at other sites.

== Epidemiology ==
Stafne defect is uncommon, and has been reported to develop anywhere between the ages of 11 and 30 years old, (although the defect is developmental, it does not seem to be present from birth, implying that the lesion develops at a later age). Usually the defect is unilateral (on one side only) and most commonly occurs in men.

== History ==
This entity was first described in 1942 by Edward C. Stafne. Stafne bone cavity is rare and is only present in 0.17% of the general population. It was previously known by many names, including static bone cyst, Stafne idiopathic bone cavity, and salivary gland inclusions in the mandible,

An early case of Stafne's defect has been discovered in a 7th-century BC adult male individual from Klazomenai, one of the 12 cities of the Ionian League (now in modern Turkey).

== Additional images ==
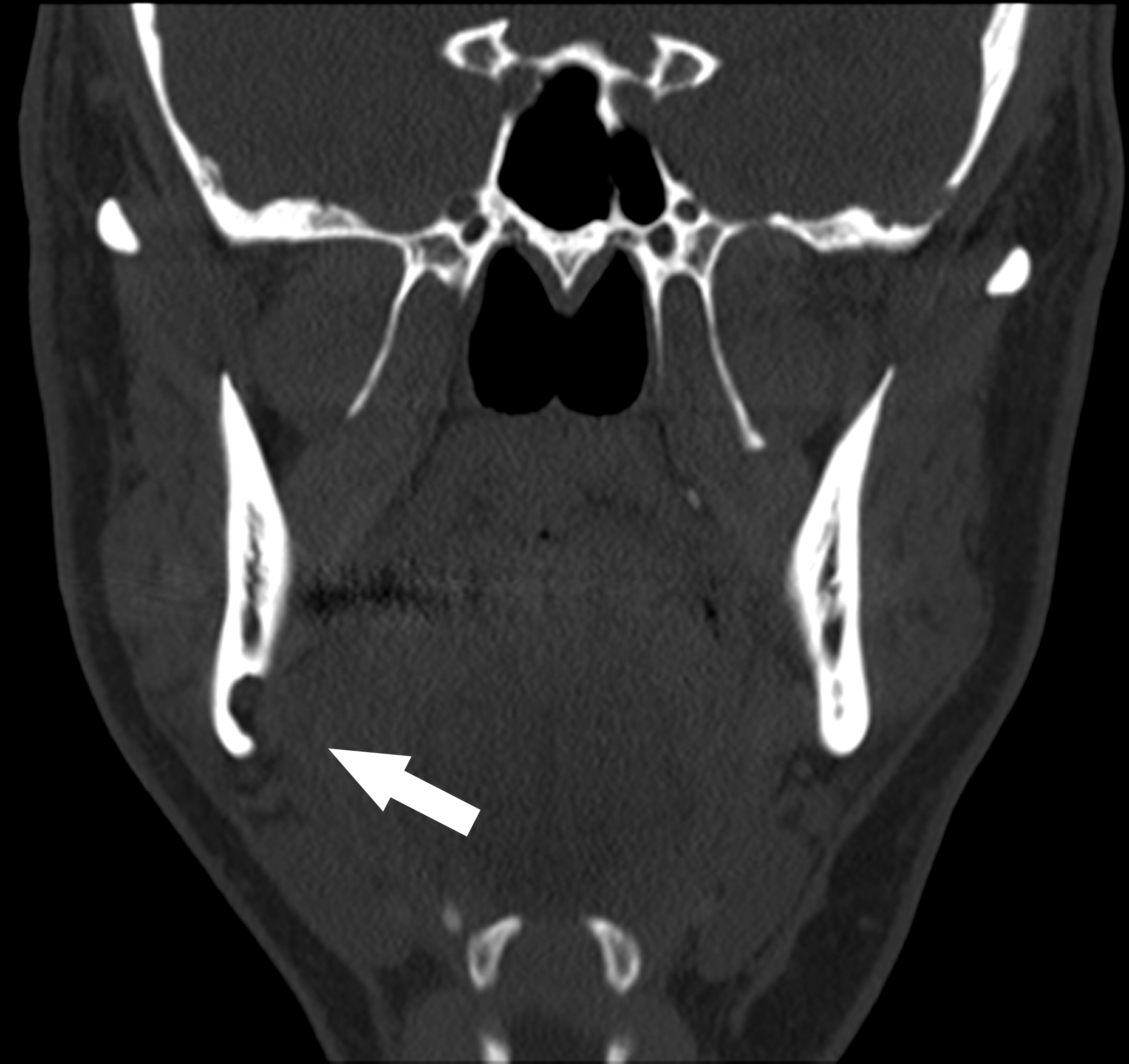
Stafne bone cavity seen on coronal CT

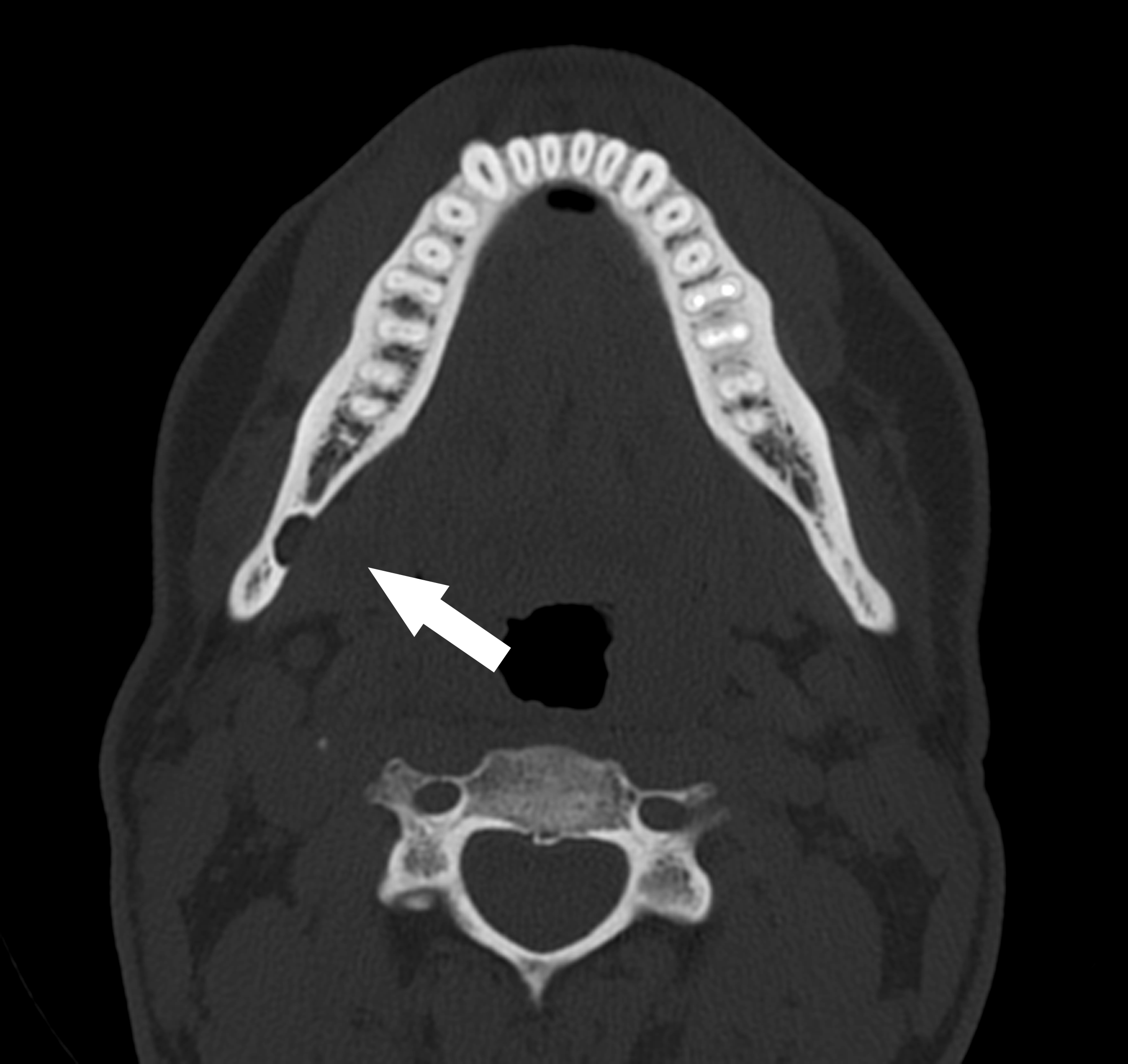
Stafne bone cavity seen on axial CT

== See also ==
- List of anatomical variation
