= Salivary gland atresia =

Absence or malformation of the salivary glands' ducts

Salivary gland atresia is congenital blockage or absence of the orifice of the ducts of major salivary glands, or part of the duct itself.

It is a very rare condition. The submandibular salivary gland duct is usually involved, having failed to cannulate during embryological development. The condition first becomes apparent in the first few days after birth where a submandibular swelling caused by a retention cyst is noticed.
