= Salivary gland aplasia =

Absence of salivary glands at birth

- Other names: Salivary gland agenesis

Salivary gland aplasia (also termed salivary gland agenesis) is the congenital absence of salivary glands. Usually the term relates to the absence of some or all of the major salivary glands.

It is a rare condition, and most known cases have been in association with syndromes of the ectodermal tissues, particularly the lacrimal apparatus. Example syndromes which have been reported with salivary gland aplasia include hereditary ectodermal dysplasia, mandibulofacial dysostosis and hemifacial microsomia.

The main significance of the condition is a lack of saliva, causing xerostomia (dry mouth), with accompanying susceptibility to dental caries (tooth decay), infections of the mouth, and upper respiratory tract infections (e.g., candidiasis, ascending sialadenitis, laryngitis and pharyngitis). Patients with salivary gland aplasia typically require regular application of topical fluoride to prevent tooth decay.
