= Oral mucocele =

Swelling due to obstructed salivary glands

Mucous cyst of the oral mucocele
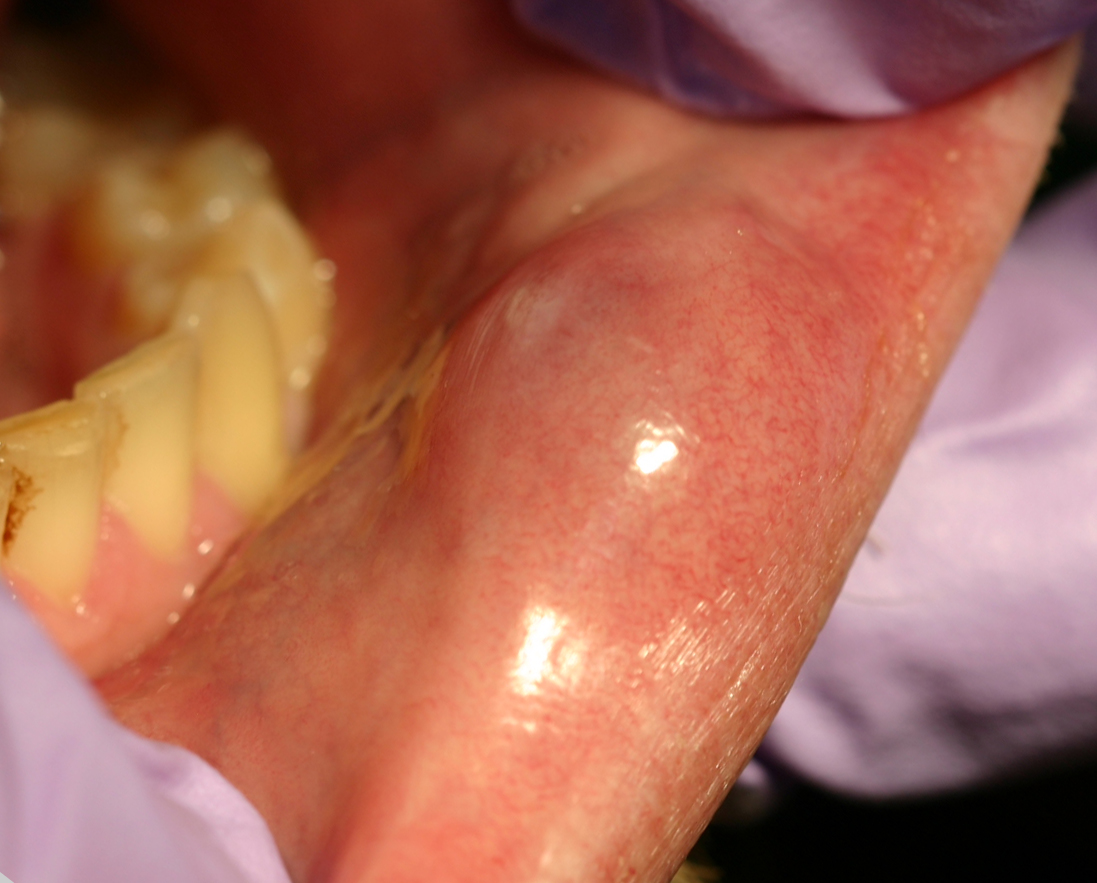
- A mucocele on the lower lip
- Specialty: Oral and maxillofacial surgery

Oral mucocele (also mucous extravasation cyst, mucous cyst of the oral mucosa, and mucous retention and extravasation phenomena) is a condition caused by two related phenomena—mucus extravasation phenomenon and mucous retention cyst.

Mucous extravasation phenomenon is a swelling of connective tissue consisting of a collection of fluid called mucus. This occurs because of a ruptured salivary gland duct usually caused by local trauma (damage) in the case of mucous extravasation phenomenon and an obstructed or ruptured salivary duct in the case of a mucus retention cyst. The mucocele has a bluish, translucent color, and is more commonly found in children and young adults.

Although these lesions are often called cysts, mucoceles are not true cysts because they have no epithelial lining. Rather, they are polyps.

== Signs and symptoms ==
The size of oral mucoceles vary from 1 mm to several centimeters and they usually are slightly transparent with a blue tinge. On palpation, mucoceles may appear fluctuant, but can also be firm. Their duration lasts from days to years, and may have recurrent swelling with occasional rupturing of its contents.

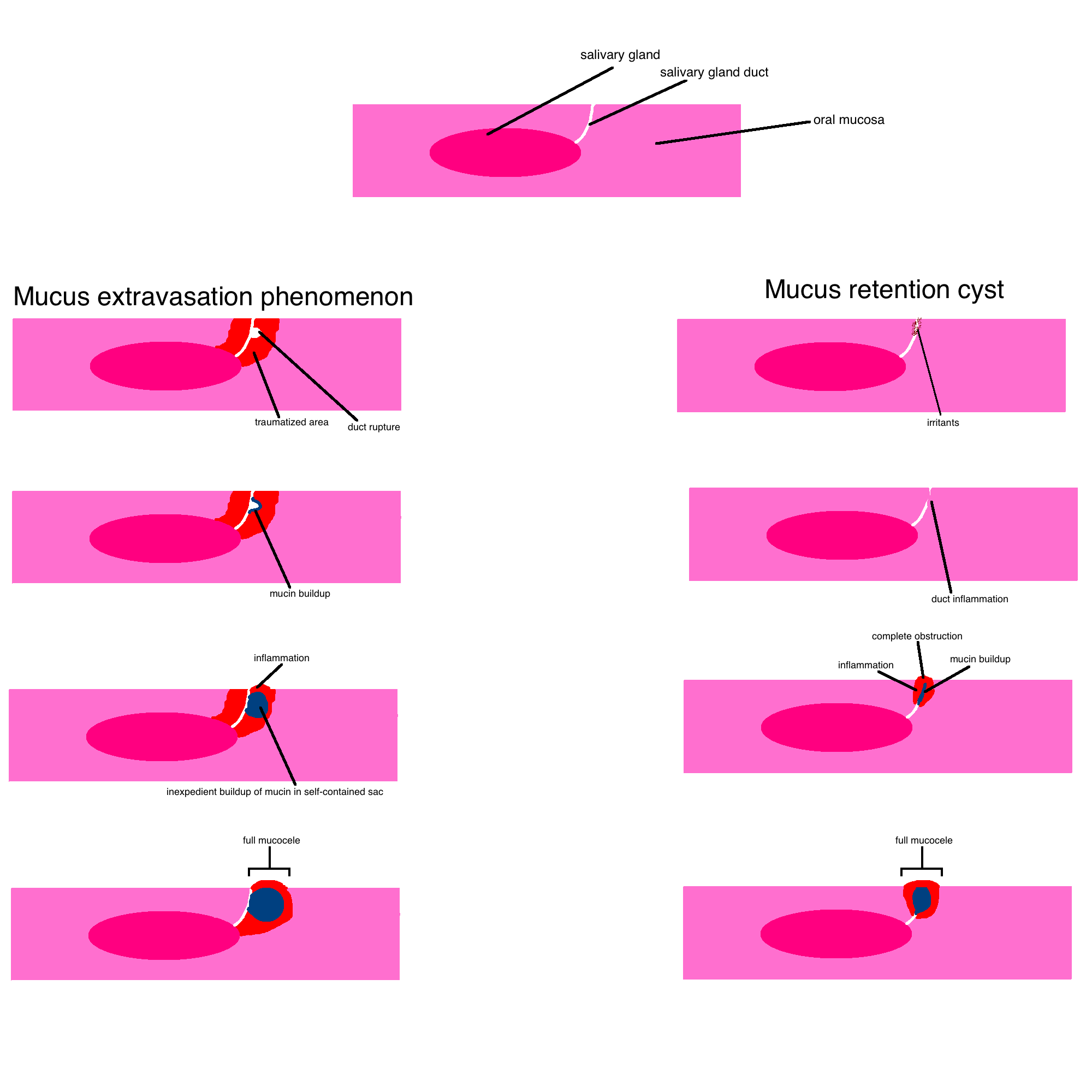
Simplistic representation of the formation of mucoceles

=== Locations ===
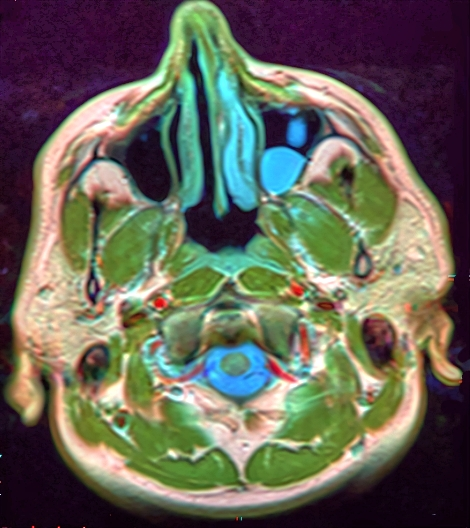
Mucous retention cyst in maxillary sinus indicated by the asymmetrical blue lump to the right of the nose

The most common location to find a mucocele is the inner surface of the lower lip. It can also be found on the inner side of the cheek (known as the buccal mucosa), on the anterior ventral tongue, and the floor of the mouth. When found on the floor of the mouth, the mucocele is referred to as a ranula. They are rarely found on the upper lip. As their name suggests, they are basically mucus-lined cysts and they can also occur in the paranasal sinuses, most commonly the frontal sinuses, the frontoethmoidal region, and the maxillary sinus. Sphenoid sinus involvement is extremely rare. When the lumen of the vermiform appendix of the intestine gets blocked due to any factor, a mucocele can also form there.

=== Variations ===
A variant of a mucocele is found on the palate, retromolar pad, and posterior buccal mucosa. Known as a "superficial mucocele", this type presents as single or multiple vesicles and bursts into an ulcer. Despite healing after a few days, superficial mucoceles recur often in the same location. Other causes of bumps inside lips are aphthous ulcer, lipoma, benign tumors of salivary glands, submucous abscesses, and haemangiomas.

== Diagnosis ==
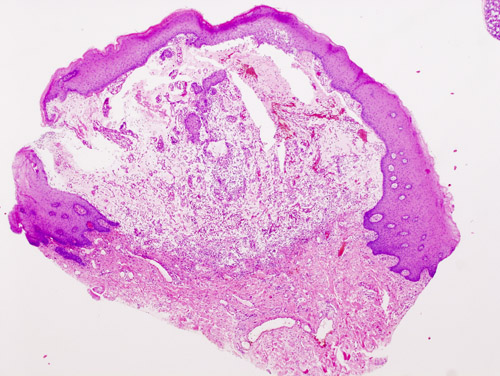
Histopathologic image of extravasation type mucocele of the lower lip, H & E stain

Microscopically, mucoceles appears as granulation tissue surrounding mucin. Since inflammation occurs concurrently, neutrophils and foamy histiocytes usually are present. On a CT scan, a mucocele is fairly homogenous, with an attenuation of about 10-18 Hounsfield units.

=== Classification ===
Both mucous retention and extravasation phenomena are classified as salivary gland disorders.

== Treatment ==
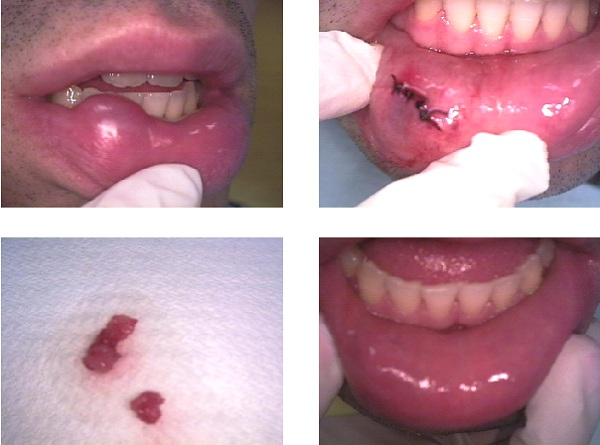
Surgical removal of a mucocele

Some mucoceles spontaneously resolve on their own after a short time. Others are chronic and require surgical removal. Recurrence is possible, thus the adjacent salivary gland may be excised as a preventive measure. Hence surgical removal of cyst is treatment of choice.

Several types of procedures are available for the surgical removal of mucoceles. These include laser and minimally invasive techniques, which means recovery times are reduced drastically.

Micro-marsupialization is an alternative procedure to surgical removal. It uses silk sutures in the dome of a cyst to allow new epithelialized drainage pathways. It is simpler, less traumatic, and well tolerated by patients, especially children.

If the mucocele persists, individuals should see an oral, or oral and maxillofacial, surgeon to discuss further treatment.

== See also ==
- Sialocele
- Seroma
