= Ectopic salivary gland tissue =

Presence of salivary gland tissue elsewhere in the body

Ectopic salivary gland tissue which is located in sites other than the normal location is variously described as aberrant, accessory, ectopic, heterotopic or salivary gland choristoma.

== Accessory salivary glands ==
An accessory salivary gland is ectopic salivary gland tissue with a salivary gland duct system. The most common location of accessory salivary gland tissue is an extra major salivary gland in front of the parotid gland. It is typically about 3 cm or less in size, and drains into the parotid duct via a single tributary. Accessory parotid tissue is found in 21-56% of adults. Any disease process which affects the salivary glands, including cancer, may also occur within an accessory salivary gland tissue.

== Heterotopic salivary gland tissue ==
Salivary gland heterotopia is where salivary gland acini cells are present in an abnormal location without any duct system. The most common location is the cervical lymph nodes. Other reported sites of heterotopic salivary gland tissue are the middle ear, parathyroid glands, thyroid gland, pituitary gland, cerebellopontine angle, soft tissue medial to sternocleidomastoid, stomach, rectum and vulva. Salivary gland neoplasm occurrence within heterotopic salivary gland tissue is rare.

== See also ==
- Stafne defect
