= Ranula =

Swelling in the lower mouth due to salivary gland blockage

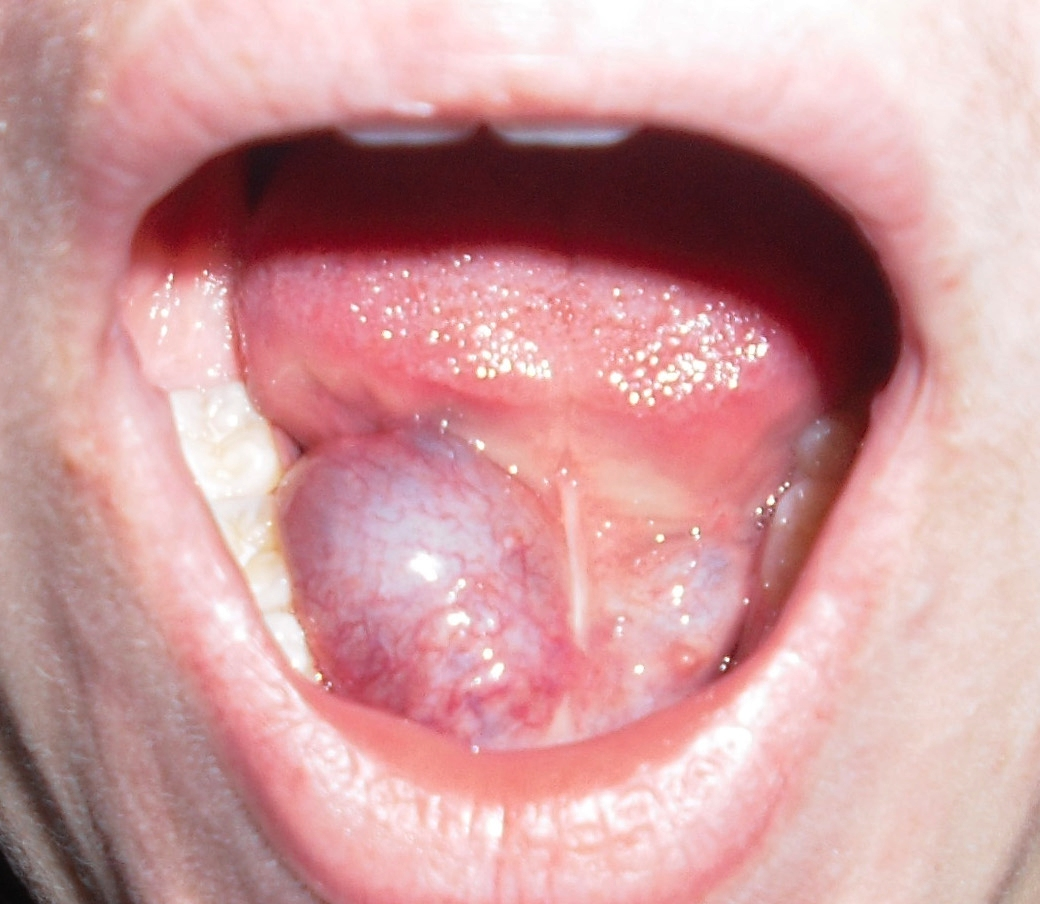
- Specialty: Oral and maxillofacial surgery

A ranula is a mucus extravasation cyst involving a sublingual gland and is a type of mucocele found on the floor of the mouth. Ranulae present as a swelling of connective tissue consisting of collected mucin from a ruptured salivary gland caused by local trauma. If small and asymptomatic further treatment may not be needed, otherwise minor oral surgery may be indicated.

== Signs and symptoms ==
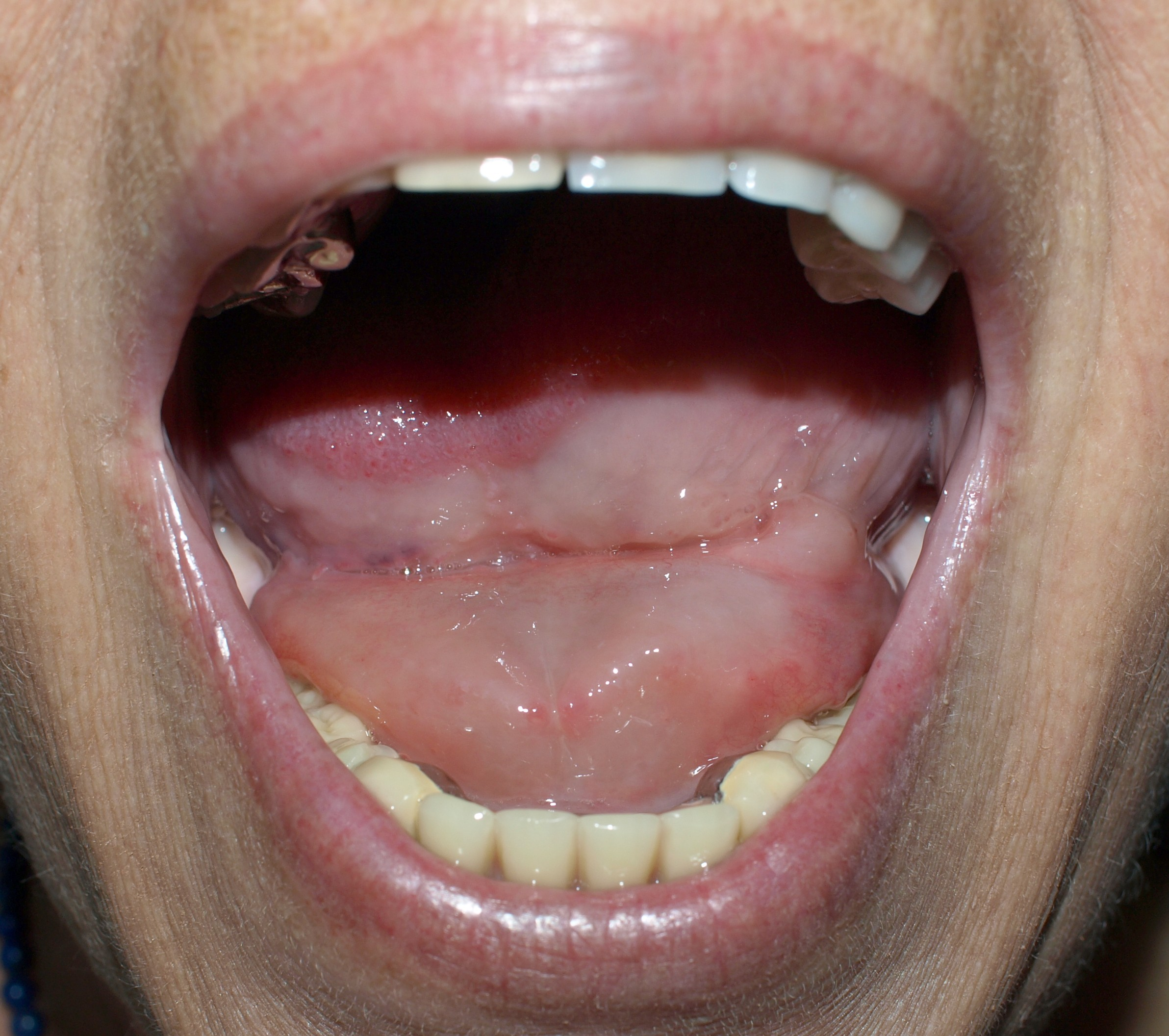
Ranula in a female

A ranula usually presents as a translucent, blue, dome-shaped, fluctuant swelling in the tissues of the floor of the mouth. If the lesion is deeper, then there is a greater thickness of tissue separating from the oral cavity and the blue translucent appearance may not be a feature. A ranula can develop into a large lesion many centimeters in diameter, with resultant elevation of the tongue and possibly interfering with swallowing (dysphagia). The swelling is not fixed, may not show blanching, and is non-painful unless it becomes secondarily infected. The usual location is lateral to the midline, which may be used to help distinguish it from a midline dermoid cyst. A cervical ranula presents as a swelling in the neck, with or without a swelling in the mouth. In common with other mucoceles, ranulae may rupture and then cause recurrent swelling. Ranulae may be asymptomatic, although they can fluctuate rapidly in size, shrinking and swelling, making them difficult to detect.

=== Complications ===
- Infection
- Repeated trauma
- Bursting and reformation
- Dysphagia (in the case of a large ranula)

== Causes ==
Minor trauma to the floor of the mouth is thought to damage the delicate ducts that drain saliva from the sublingual gland into the oral cavity. The lesion is a mucous extravasation cyst (mucocele) of the floor of mouth, although a ranula is often larger than other mucoceles (mainly because the overlying mucosa is thicker). They can grow so large that they fill the mouth. The most usual source of the mucin spillage is the sublingual salivary gland, but ranulae may also arise from the submandibular duct or the minor salivary glands in the floor of the mouth. A cervical ranula occurs when the spilled mucin dissects its way through the mylohyoid muscle, which separates the sublingual space from the submandibular space, and creates a swelling in the neck. It may occur following rupture of a simple ranula. Rarely, ranulae may extend backwards into the parapharyngeal space.

== Mechanism ==
The fluid within a ranula has the viscous, jellylike consistency of egg white.

== Diagnosis ==
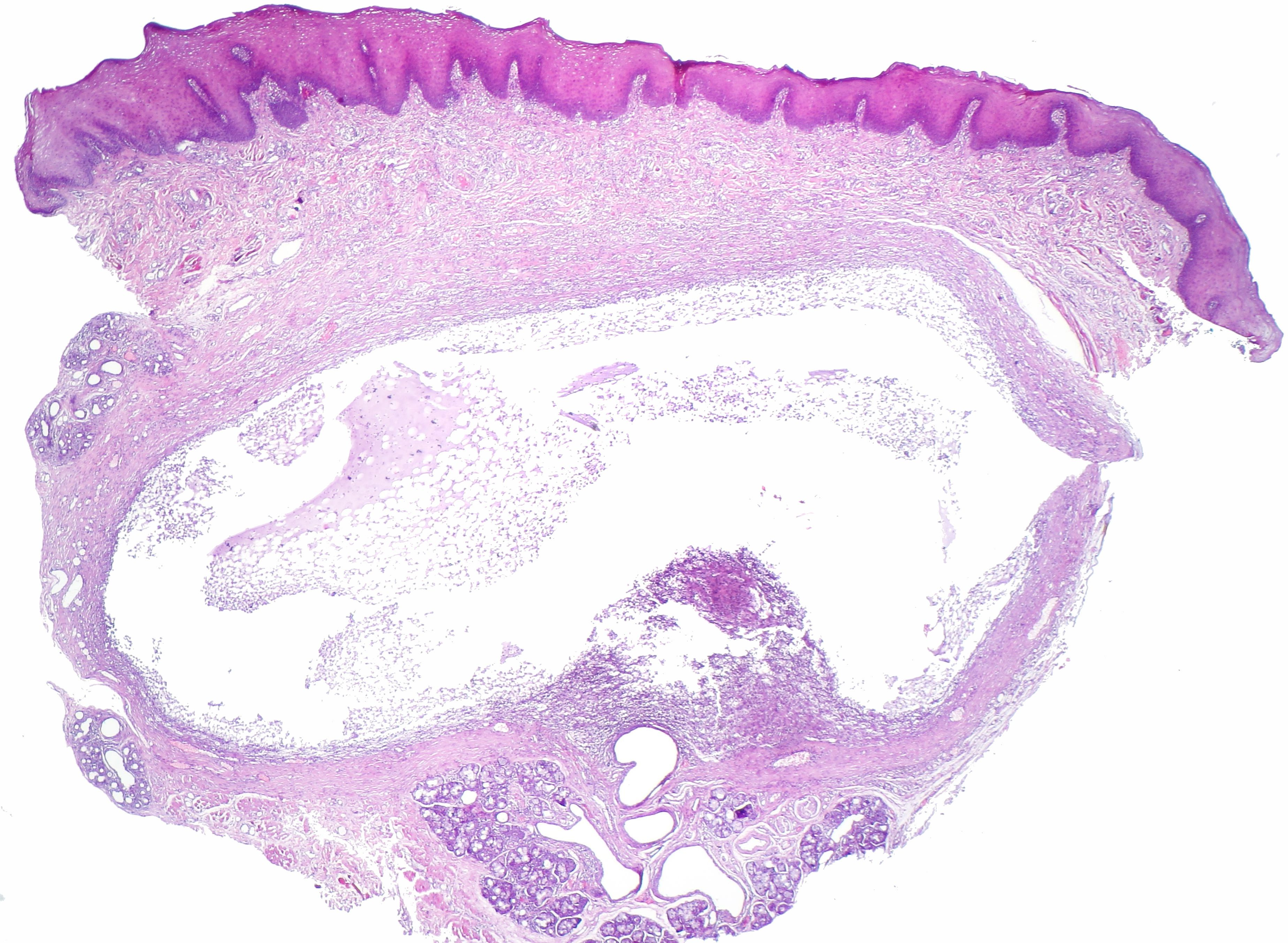
Ranula, micrograph. H&E stain.

The histologic appearance is similar to mucoceles from other locations. The spilled mucin causes a granulation tissue to form, which usually contains foamy histiocytes. Ultrasound and magnetic resonance imaging may be useful to image the lesion. A small squamous cell carcinoma obstructing the Wharton duct may require clinical examination to be distinguished from a ranula.

=== Criteria ===
- Mostly seen in young children and adolescents, both sexes are equally affected. Swelling in floor of mouth, which may be painful. Mostly unilateral, on one side of frenulum.
- Shape is spherical
- Size varies from 1 – 5 cm in diameter
- Color is pale blue with characteristics semi transparent appearance.
- Surface is smooth and mucous membrane is mobile over the swelling.
- Tenderness is absent
- Fluctuation test is positive
- Transillumination test is positive
- Cervical lymph nodes are not enlarged.
- May or may not have prolongation in the neck.

=== Classification ===
A ranula is a type of mucocele, and therefore could be classified as a disorder of the salivary glands. Usually a ranula is confined to the floor of the mouth (termed a "simple ranula"). An unusual variant is the cervical ranula (also called a plunging or diving ranula), where the swelling is in the neck rather than the floor of the mouth. The term ranula is also sometimes used to refer to other similar swellings of the floor of mouth such as true salivary duct cysts, dermoid cysts and cystic hygromas. The Latin word rana means "frog" (ranula = "little frog").

== Treatment ==
Treatment of ranulae usually involves removal of the sublingual gland. Surgery may not be required if the ranula is small and asymptomatic. Marsupialization may sometimes be used, where the intra-oral lesion is opened to the oral cavity with the aim of allowing the sublingual gland to re-establish connection with the oral cavity.

== Epidemiology ==
The lesion is usually present in children. Ranulae are the most common pathologic lesion associated with the sublingual glands.

== Other animals ==
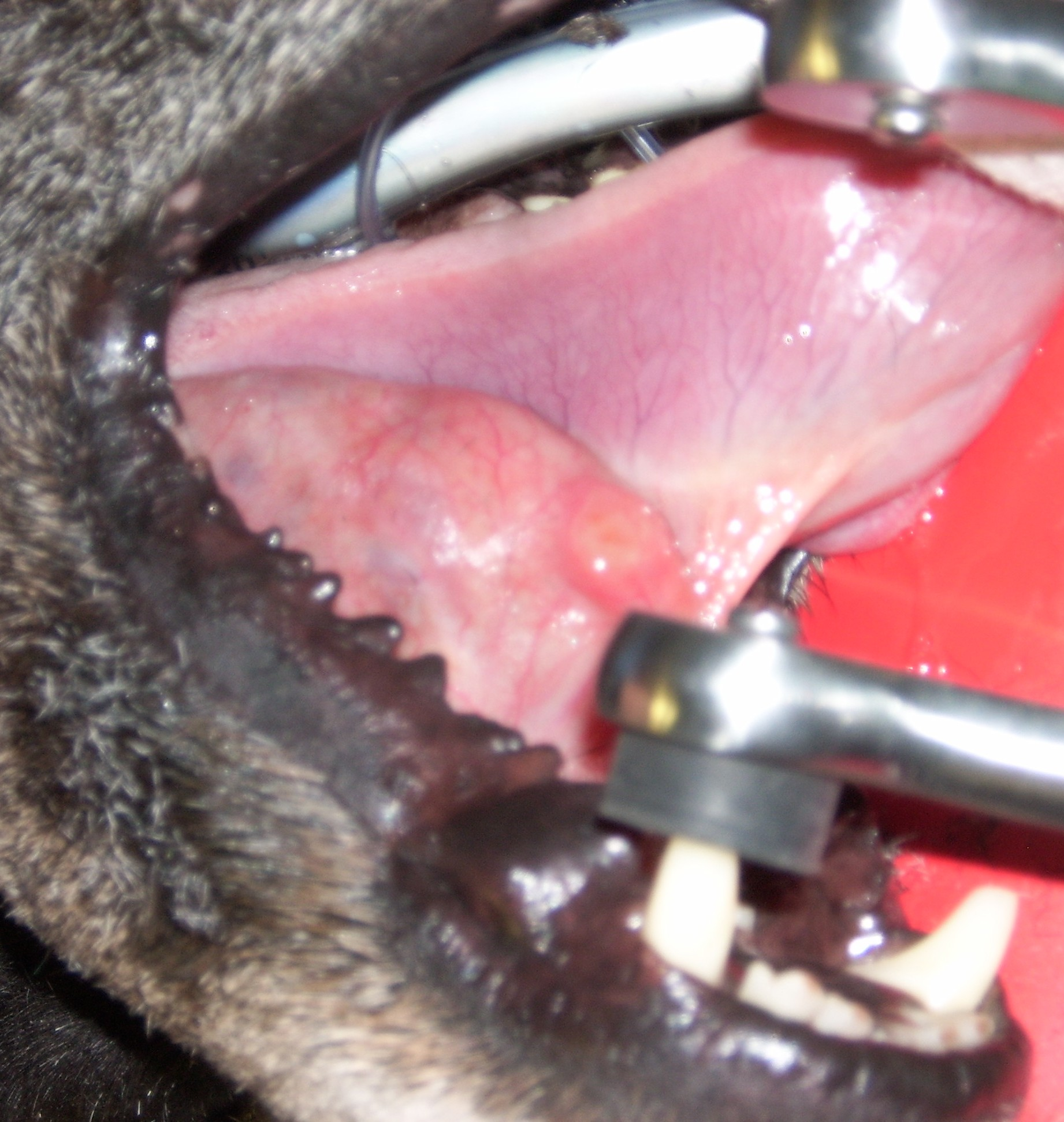
Ranula in a dog

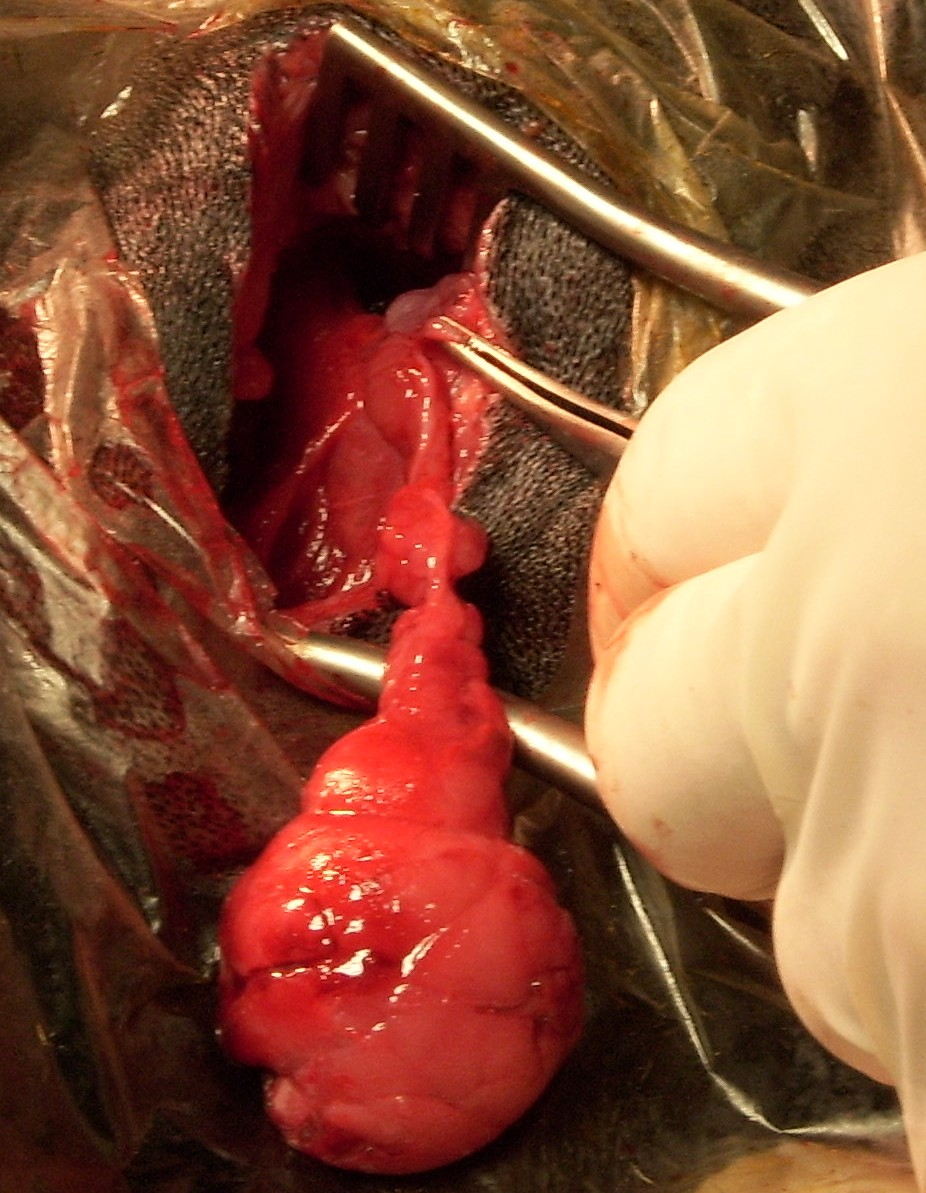
Excision of both mandibular and major sublingual glands in a dog
