= Mucocele =

Distension with accumulation of mucus

A mucocele is a distension of a hollow organ or cavity because of mucus buildup.

== By location ==
=== Oral ===
Oral mucocele is the most common benign lesion of the salivary glands generally conceded to be of traumatic origin. It is characterized by the pooling of mucus in a cavity due to the rupture of salivary ducts or acini. It can occur in the lower lip, palate, cheeks, tongue and the floor of the mouth.

=== Appendix ===
Appendiceal mucocele is found in 0.3 to 0.7% of the appendectomies. It is characterized by the dilation of the organ lumen with mucus accumulation. Appendix mucocele may come as a consequence of obstructive or inflammatory processes, cystadenomas or cystadenocarcinomas. Its main complication is pseudomyxoma peritonei.

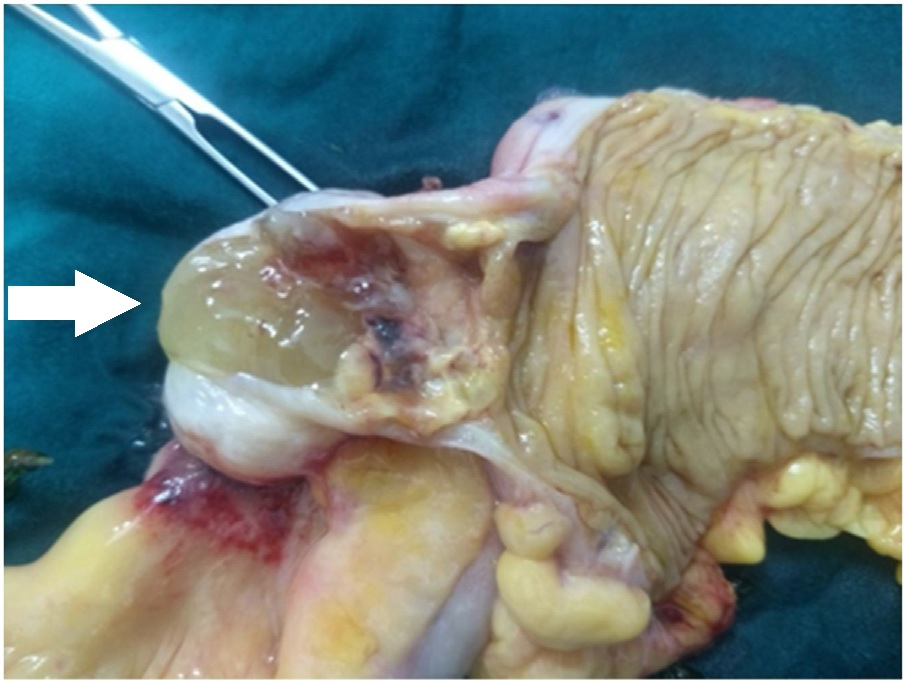
Gross pathology of mucocele of the appendix

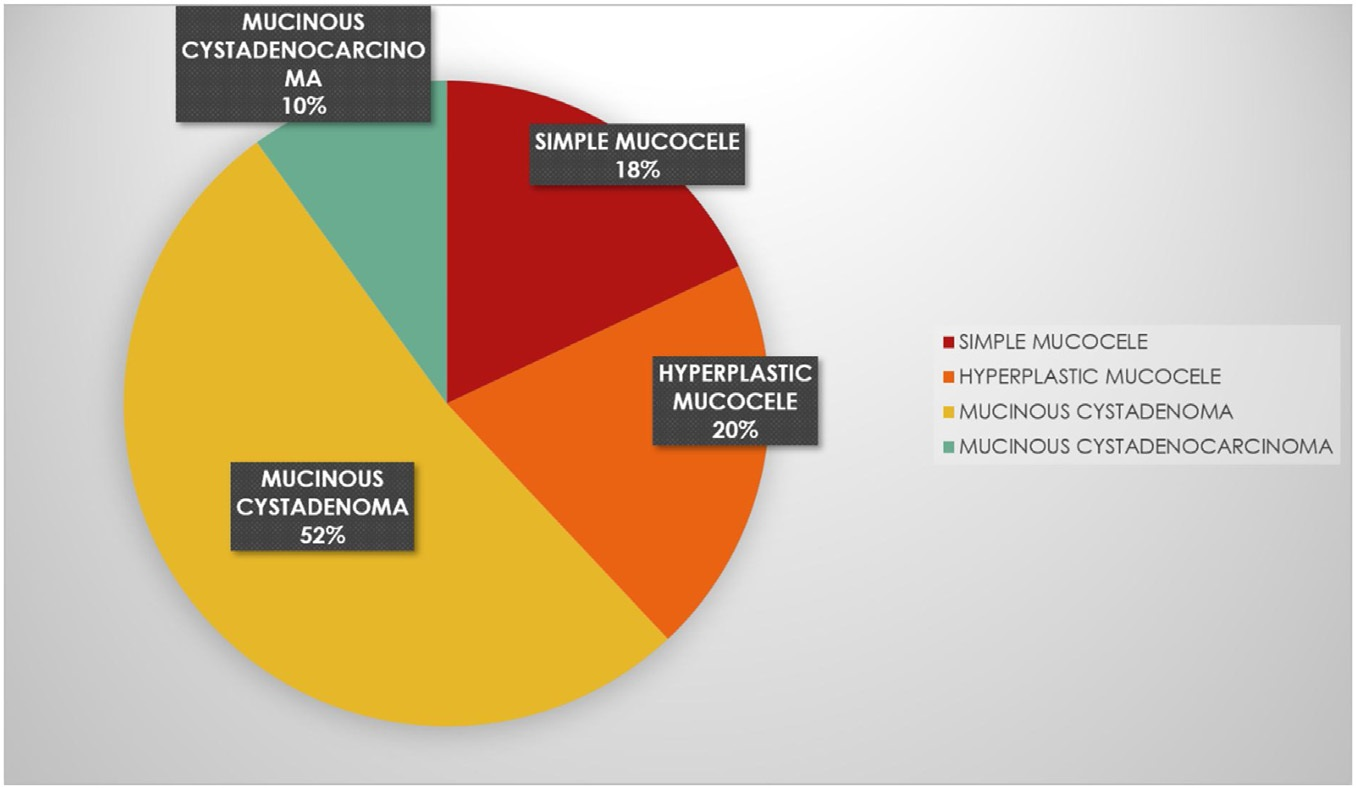
Pie chart of histological types of mucocele of the appendix, with relative incidence

=== Other ===
- Mucocele of the petrous apex
- Mucocele of the paranasal sinuses
- Gallbladder mucocele

== Diagnosis ==
Superficial mucoceles can often be diagnosed by appearance and consistency alone. Sometimes, it is indicated to perform diagnostic imaging and/or needle biopsy.

On a CT scan, a mucocele is fairly homogenous, with an attenuation of about 10-18 Hounsfield units.

== See also ==
- Mucous retention cyst
