= HIV salivary gland disease =

Medical condition

Human immunodeficiency virus salivary gland disease (abbreviated to HIV-SGD, and also termed HIV-associated salivary gland disease), is swelling of the salivary glands and/or xerostomia in individuals infected with human immunodeficiency virus.

== Signs and symptoms ==
- Gradual enlargement of the major salivary glands, particularly the parotid glands. This swelling may be on one side or both sides, may cause disfigurement and may be painful.
- Xerostomia (dry mouth) with no other cause such as a side effect of medications.

HIV-SGD may be the presenting sign of HIV infection. There may also be xerophthalmia (dry eyes) and arthralgia (joint pain), similar to Sjögren syndrome.

== Epidemiology ==
HIV-SGD is more prevalent in HIV positive children than HIV positive adults, at about 19% and 1% respectively. Unlike other oral manifestations of HIV/AIDS such as Kaposi sarcoma, oral hairy leukoplakia and oral candidiasis, which decreased following the introduction of highly active antiretroviral therapy (HAART), HIV-SGD has increased.
