= Sublingual gland =

Major salivary glands in the mouth

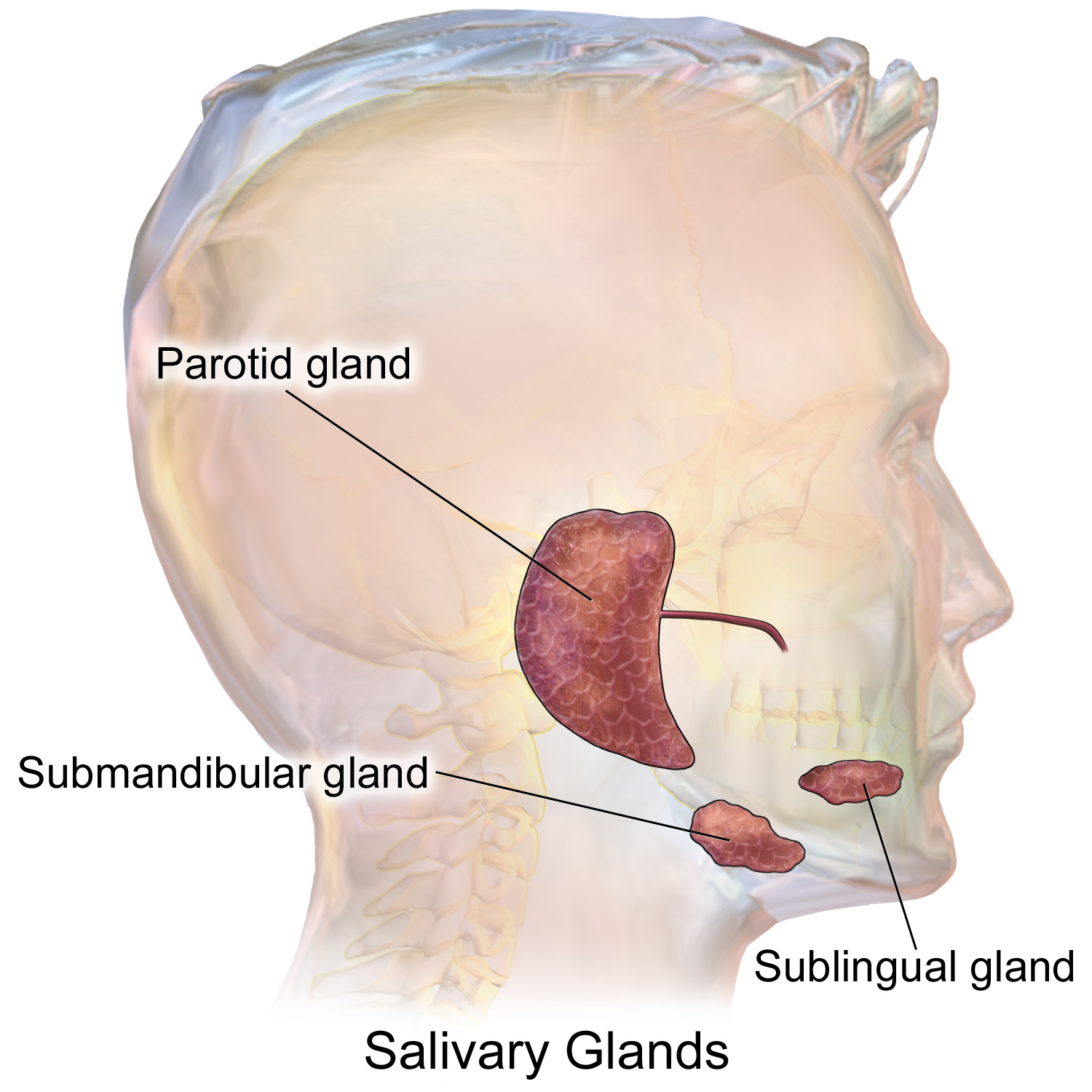
- Salivary glands

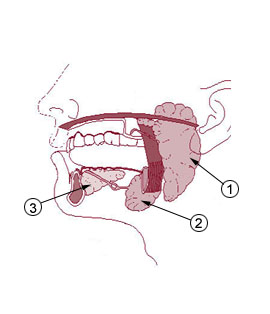
- Salivary glands: #1 is parotid gland, #2 is submandibular gland, #3 is sublingual gland

Details
- Part of: Salivary glands
- System: Digestive system
- Location: Mouth
- Artery: Sublingual artery (branch of lingual artery of external carotid artery)
- Nerve: Submandibular ganglion
- Lymph: Submandibular lymph nodes

Identifiers
- Latin: glandula sublingualis
- MeSH: D013361
- TA98: A05.1.02.008
- TA2: 2807
- FMA: 59791

The sublingual gland (glandula sublingualis) is a seromucous polystomatic exocrine gland. Located underneath the oral diaphragm (diaphragma oris), the sublingual gland is the smallest and most diffuse of the three major salivary glands of the oral cavity, with the other two being the submandibular and parotid. The sublingual gland provides approximately 3-5% of the total salivary volume.

== Structure ==
The sublingual glands are located anterior and superior to the submandibular gland and inferior and lateral to the tongue, as well as inferior to the mucous membrane of the floor of the mouth. They are bound laterally by the bone of the mandible and inferolaterally by the mylohyoid muscle. The glands can be palpated posteriorly to each mandibular canine. Placing one index finger within the mouth and the fingertips of the opposite hand outside it, the compressed gland is manually palpated between the inner and outer fingers.

The sublingual gland is constituted by one major duct and approximately 20 small excretory ducts, with the latter often being referred to as ducts of Rivinus. The largest of all, the sublingual duct (of Bartholin) joins the submandibular duct to drain through the sublingual caruncle. The sublingual caruncle is a small papilla near the midline of the floor of the mouth on each side of the lingual frenum. Most of the remaining small sublingual ducts (of Rivinus) open separately into the mouth on an elevated crest of mucous membrane, the plica sublingualis (aka sublingual fold), formed by the gland and located on either side of the frenulum linguae.

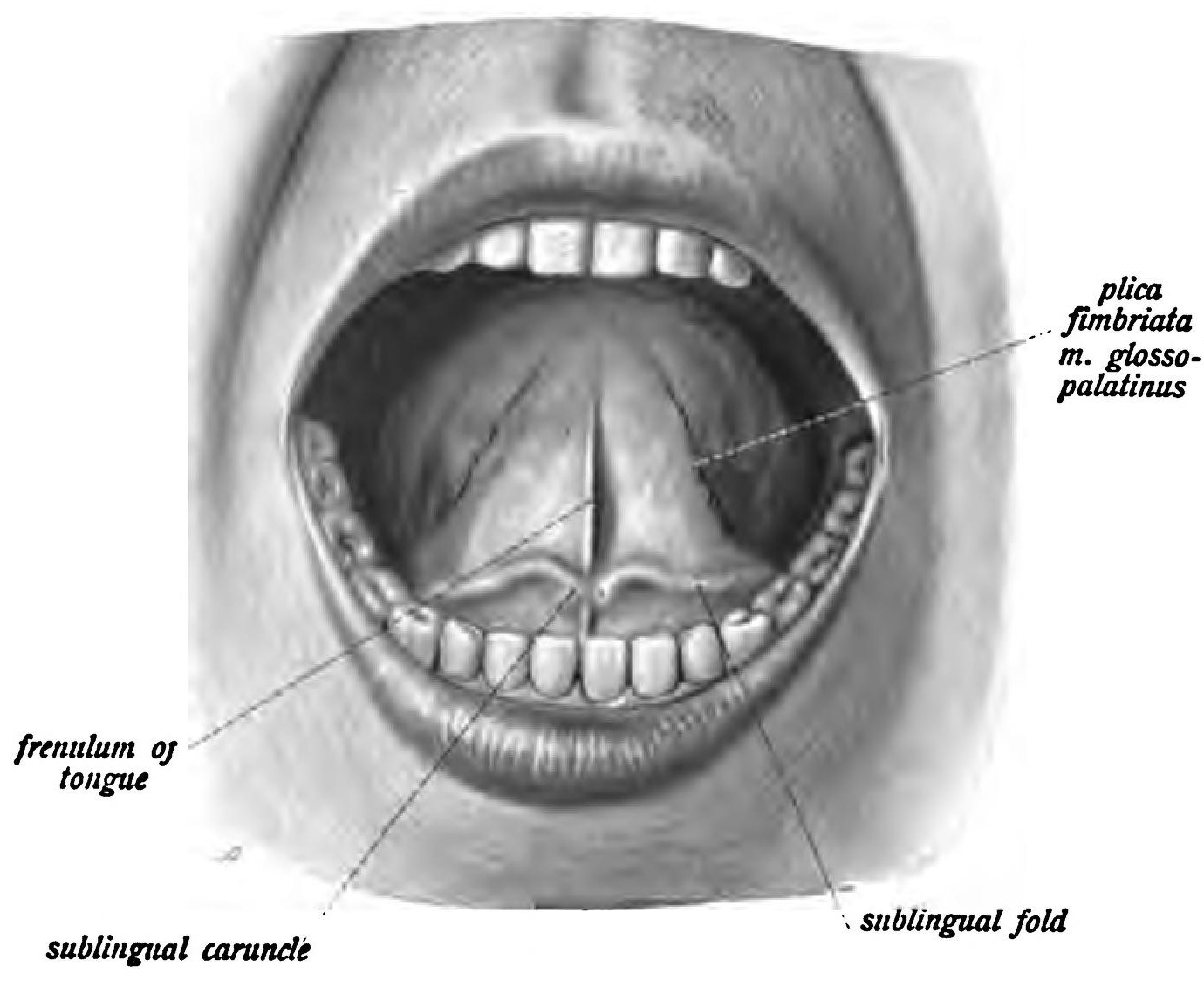
Drawing of an open mouth showing the frenulum linguae and surrounding structures

=== Microanatomy ===
The sublingual gland consists mostly of mucous acini having serous demilunes and is therefore categorized as a mixed mucous gland with mostly a mucous product. Striated and intercalated ducts are also present.

=== Blood supply ===
The gland receives its blood supply from the sublingual and submental arteries. Lymph from the sublingual salivary gland drains into the submandibular lymph nodes.

=== Nerve supply ===
The chorda tympani nerve (from the facial nerve via the submandibular ganglion) is secretomotor and provides parasympathetic supply to the sublingual glands. The path of the nerve is as follows: junction between pons and medulla, through internal acoustic meatus and facial canal to chorda tympani, through middle ear cavity, out petrotympanic fissure to join the lingual nerve, travels with lingual nerve to synapse at the submandibular ganglion, then postganglionic fibers travels to the sublingual gland.

=== Development ===
The sublingual salivary glands appear in the eighth week of prenatal development, two weeks later than the other two major salivary glands. They develop from epithelial buds in the sulcus surrounding the sublingual folds on the floor of the mouth, lateral to the developing submandibular gland. These buds branch and form into cords that canalize to form the sublingual ducts associated with the gland. The rounded terminal ends of the cords form acini.

== Clinical significance ==
Ranulas are the most common pathologic lesion associated with the sublingual glands.

== Additional images ==
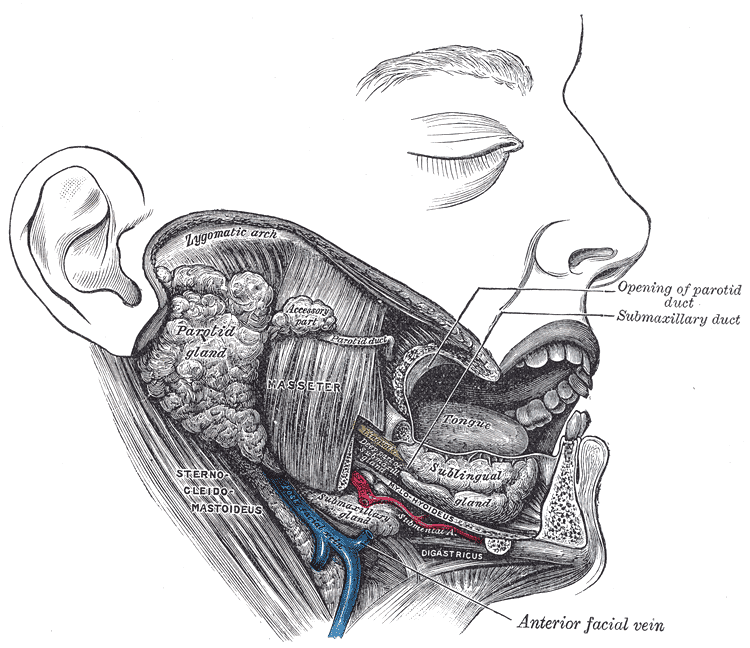
Imaging showing the sublingual glands and surrounding structures.

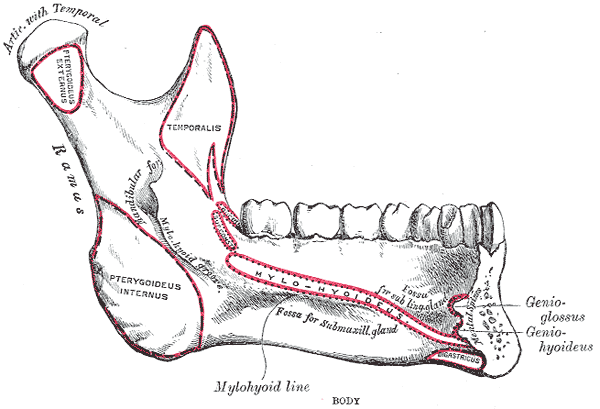
Mandible. Inner surface. Side view.

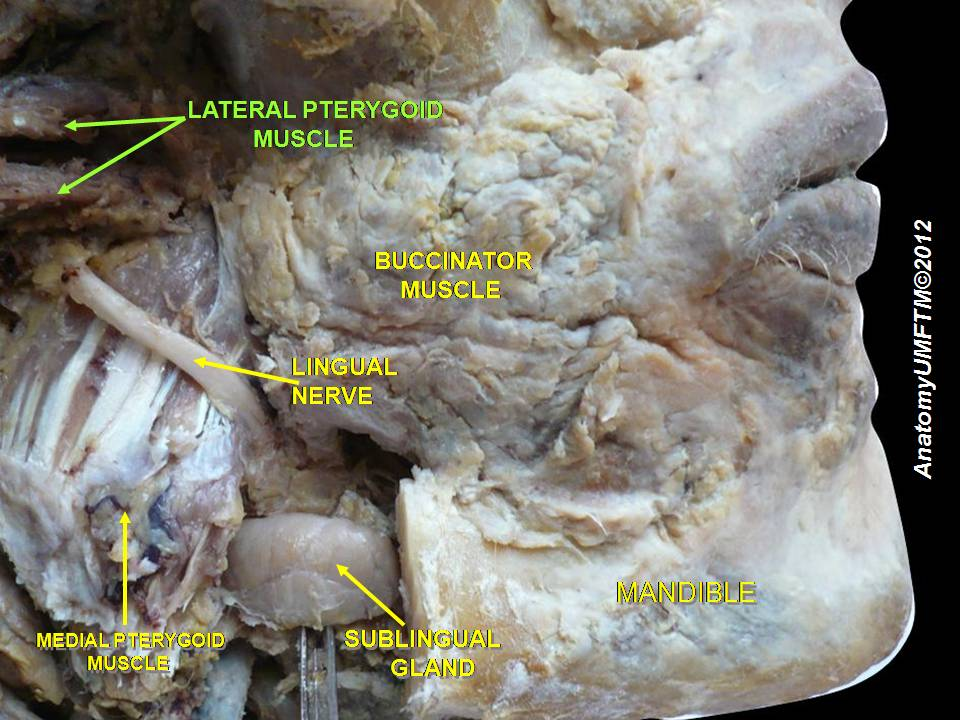
Sublingual gland

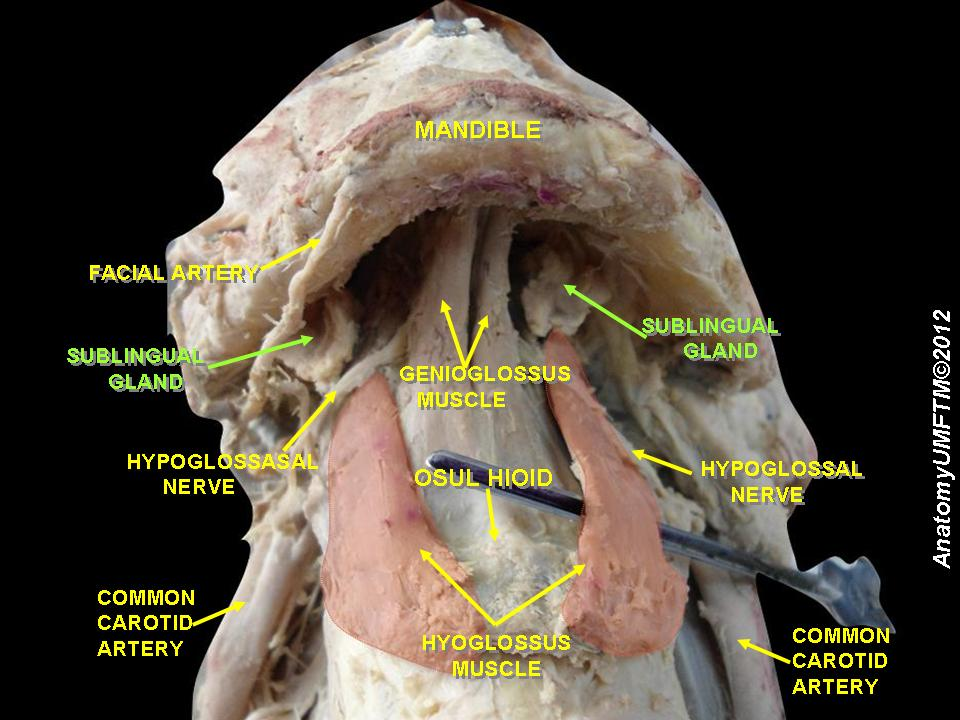
Sublingual gland

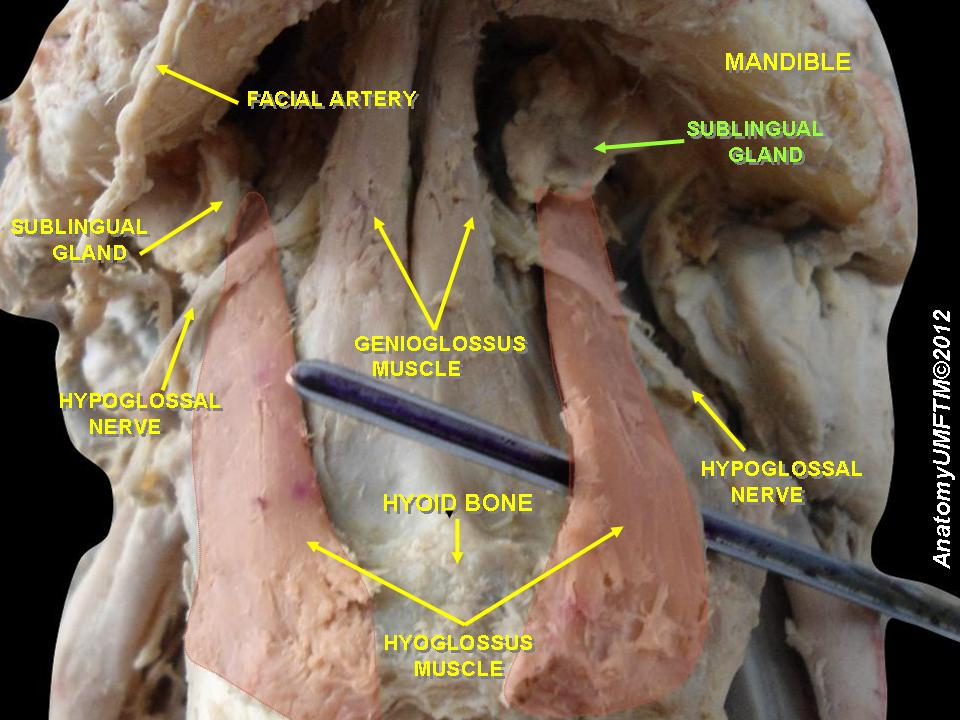
Sublingual gland
