= Major sublingual duct =

Excretory duct of the sublingual gland

Details

Identifiers
- Latin: ductus sublingualis major
- TA98: A05.1.02.009
- TA2: 2808
- FMA: 59986

The excretory ducts of the sublingual gland are from eight to twenty in number. Of the smaller sublingual ducts (ducts of Rivinus), some join the submandibular duct; others open separately into the mouth, on the elevated crest of mucous membrane (plica sublingualis), caused by the projection of the gland, on either side of the frenulum linguae. One or more join to form the major sublingual duct (larger sublingual duct, duct of Bartholin), which opens into the submandibular duct.
