= Breast cancer classification =

Medical classification system

Breast cancer classification divides breast cancer into categories according to different schemes criteria and serving a different purpose. The major categories are the histopathological type, the grade of the tumor, the stage of the tumor, and the expression of proteins and genes. As knowledge of cancer cell biology develops these classifications are updated.

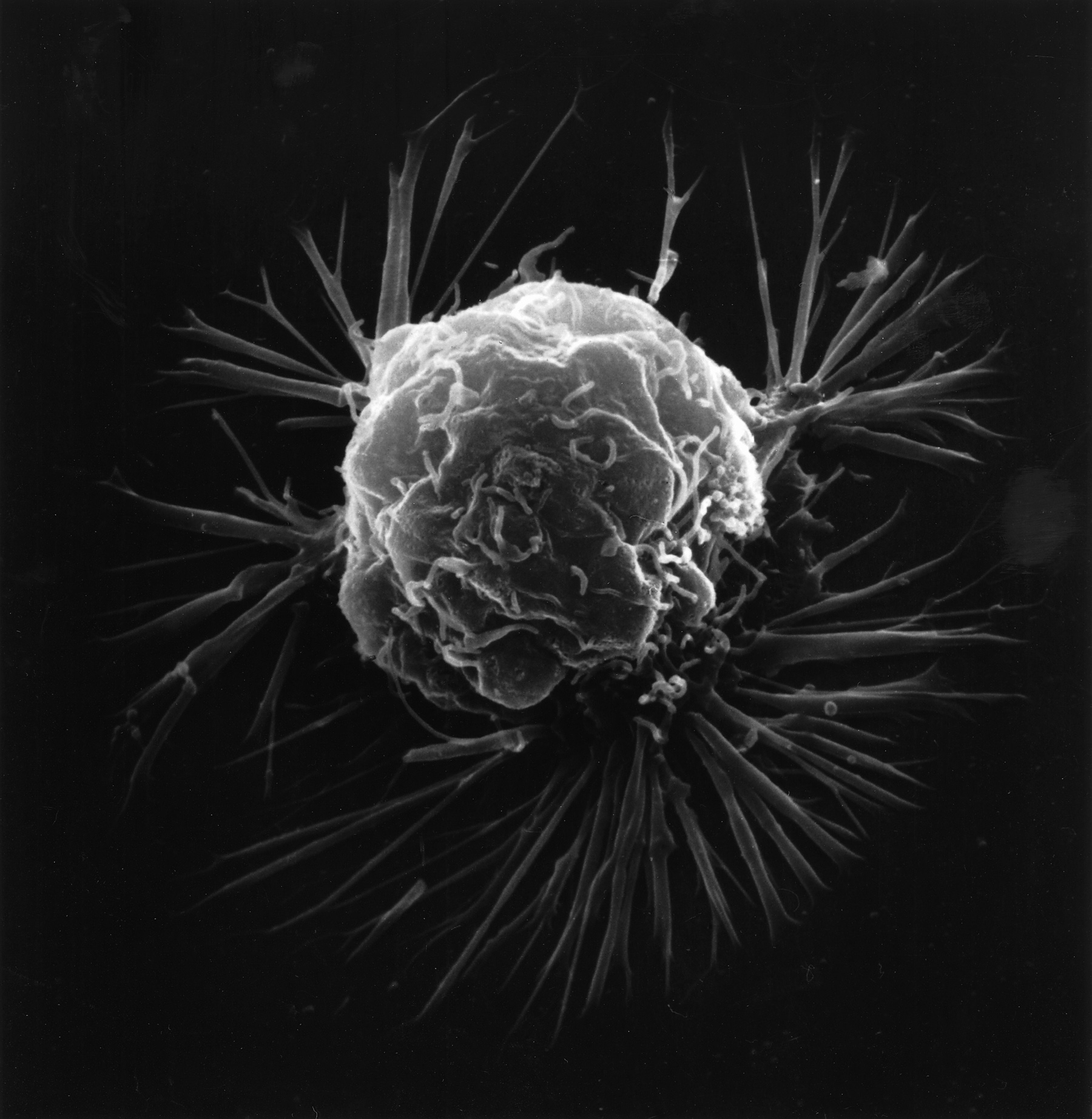
A breast cancer cell. Cancer cells are best identified by internal details, but scanning electron microscopy show how the cells respond in changing environments.

The purpose of classification is to select the best treatment. The effectiveness of a specific treatment is demonstrated for a specific breast cancer (usually by randomized, controlled trials). That treatment may not be effective in a different breast cancer. Some breast cancers are aggressive and life-threatening, and must be treated with aggressive treatments that have major adverse effects. Other breast cancers are less aggressive and can be treated with less aggressive treatments, such as lumpectomy.

Treatment algorithms rely on breast cancer classification to define specific subgroups that are each treated according to the best evidence available. Classification aspects must be carefully tested and validated, such that confounding effects are minimized, making them either true prognostic factors, which estimate disease outcomes such as disease-free or overall survival in the absence of therapy, or true predictive factors, which estimate the likelihood of response or lack of response to a specific treatment.

Classification of breast cancer is usually, but not always, primarily based on the histological appearance of tissue in the tumor. A variant from this approach, defined on the basis of physical exam findings, is that inflammatory breast cancer (IBC), a form of ductal carcinoma or malignant cancer in the ducts, is distinguished from other carcinomas by the inflamed appearance of the affected breast, which correlates with increased cancer aggressivity.

== Schemes or aspects ==
=== Overview ===
Breast cancers can be classified by different schemata. Each of these aspects influences treatment response and prognosis. Description of a breast cancer would optimally include all of these classification aspects, as well as other findings, such as signs found on physical exam. A full classification includes histopathological type, grade, stage (TNM), receptor status, and the presence or absence of genes as determined by DNA testing:

- Histopathology. Although breast cancer has many different histologies, the considerable majority of breast cancers are derived from the epithelium lining the ducts or lobules, and are classified as mammary ductal carcinoma. Carcinoma in situ is proliferation of cancer cells within the epithelial tissue without invasion of the surrounding tissue. In contrast, invasive carcinoma invades the surrounding tissue. Perineural and/or lymphovascular space invasion is usually considered as part of the histological description of a breast cancer, and when present may be associated with more aggressive disease.
- Grade. Grading focuses on the appearance of the breast cancer cells compared to the appearance of normal breast tissue. Normal cells in an organ like the breast become differentiated, meaning that they take on specific shapes and forms that reflect their function as part of that organ. Cancerous cells lose that differentiation. In cancer, the cells that would normally line up in an orderly way to make up the milk ducts become disorganized. Cell division becomes uncontrolled. Cell nuclei become less uniform. Pathologists describe cells as well differentiated (low-grade), moderately differentiated (intermediate-grade), and poorly differentiated (high-grade) as the cells progressively lose the features seen in normal breast cells. Poorly differentiated cancers have a worse prognosis.
- Stage. The TNM classification for staging breast cancer is based on the size of the cancer where it originally started in the body and the locations to which it has travelled. These cancer characteristics are described as the size of the tumor (T), whether or not the tumor has spread to the lymph nodes (N) in the armpits, neck, and inside the chest, and whether the tumor has metastasized (M) (i.e. spread to a more distant part of the body). Larger size, nodal spread, and metastasis have a larger stage number and a worse prognosis. The main stages are:
  - Stage 0 which is in situ disease or Paget's disease of the nipple. Stage 0 is a pre-cancerous or marker condition, either ductal carcinoma in situ (DCIS) or lobular carcinoma in situ (LCIS).
  - Stages 1–3 are within the breast or regional lymph nodes.
  - Stage 4 is a metastatic cancer. Metastatic breast cancer has a less favorable prognosis.
- Receptor status. Cells have receptors on their surface and in their cytoplasm and nucleus. Chemical messengers such as hormones bind to receptors, and this causes changes in the cell. Breast cancer cells may have various receptors, the three most important in the present classification being estrogen receptor (ER), progesterone receptor (PR), and HER2/neu. The presence or absence of a receptor is denoted as positive (+) or negative (−), respectively. Cells with none of these receptors are called basal-like or triple negative. HER2-low has some HER2 proteins on the cell surface, but not enough to be classified as HER2-positive. Trastuzumab deruxtecan is the first approved therapy by the US Food and Drug Administration (FDA) targeted to people with the HER2-low breast cancer subtype.
- DNA-based classification. Understanding the specific details of a particular breast cancer may include looking at the cancer cell DNA or RNA by several different laboratory approaches. When specific DNA mutations or gene expression profiles are identified in the cancer cells this may guide the selection of treatments, either by targeting these changes, or by predicting from these alterations which non-targeted therapies are most effective.
- Other classification approaches.
  - Computer models such as Adjuvant can combine the various classification aspects according to validated algorithms and present visually appealing graphics that assist in treatment decisions.
  - The USC/Van Nuys prognostic index (VNPI) classifies ductal carcinoma in situ (DCIS) into dissimilar risk categories that may be treated accordingly.
  - The choice of which treatment to receive can be substantially influenced by comorbidity assessments.
  - Familial breast cancers may potentially undergo dissimilar treatment (such as mastectomy).

== Histopathology ==
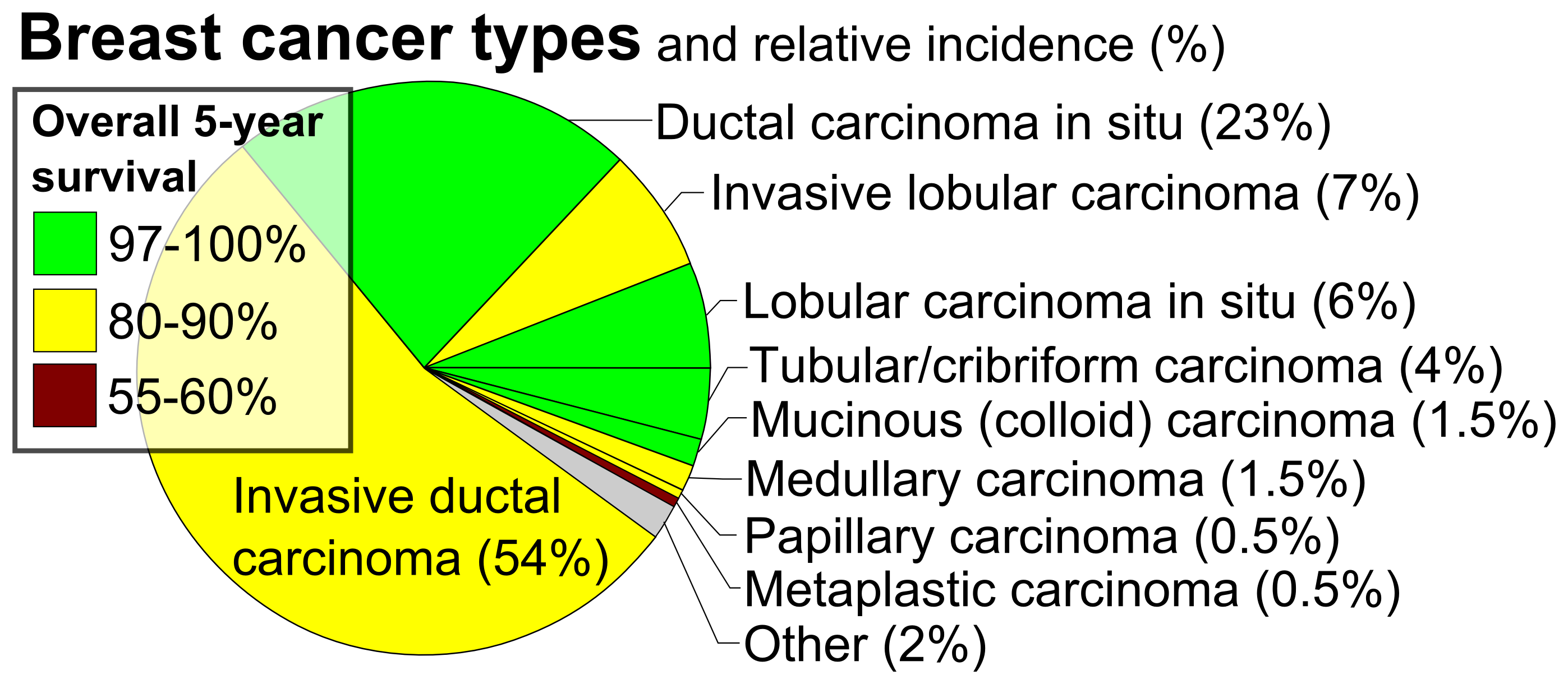
Histopathologic types of breast cancer, with relative incidences and prognoses

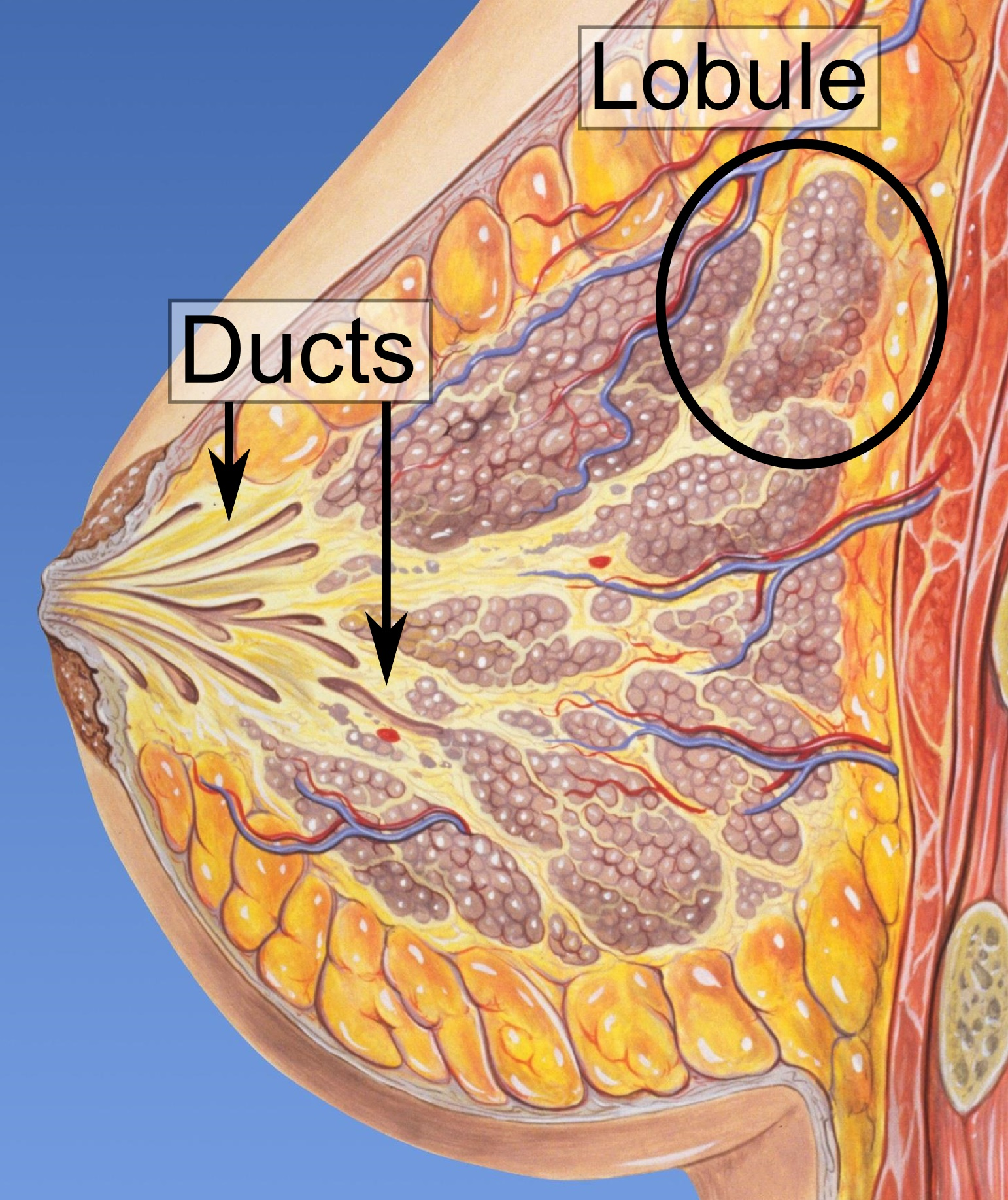
Ducts and lobules, the locations of ductal and lobular carcinoma, respectively

Histopathologic classification is based upon characteristics seen upon light microscopy of biopsy specimens. They can broadly be classified into:

- Carcinoma in situ. This group constitutes about 15-30% of breast biopsies, more so in countries with high coverage of breast screening programs. These have favorable prognosis, with 5-year survival rates of 97-99%.
- Invasive carcinoma. This group constitutes the other 70-85%. The most common type in this group is invasive ductal carcinoma, representing about 80% of invasive carcinomas. In the US, 55% of breast cancers are invasive ductal carcinoma. Invasive lobular carcinoma represent about 10% of invasive carcinomas, and 5% of all breast cancers in the US. The overall 5-year survival rate for both invasive ductal carcinoma and invasive lobular carcinoma was approximately 85% in 2003. Ductal carcinoma in situ, on the other hand, is in itself harmless, although if untreated approximately 60% of these low-grade DCIS lesions will become invasive over the course of 40 years in follow-up.

=== WHO classification ===
The 2012 World Health Organization (WHO) classification of tumors of the breast which includes benign (generally harmless) tumors and malignant (cancerous) tumors, recommends the following pathological types:

Invasive breast carcinomas

- Invasive carcinoma
  - Most are "not otherwise specified"
  - The remainder are given subtypes:
    - Pleomorphic carcinoma
    - Carcinoma with osteoclast giant cells
    - Carcinoma with choriocarcinoma features
    - Carcinoma with melanotic features
- Invasive lobular carcinoma
  - Classic
  - Solid
  - Mixed
  - Alveolar
  - Tubulolobular
  - Pleomorphic
- Tubular carcinoma
- Invasive cribriform carcinoma of the breast (also termed invasive cribriform carcinoma)
- Medullary carcinoma of the breast
- Mucinous carcinoma and other tumours with abundant mucin
  - Mucinous carcinoma of the breast
  - Cystadenocarcinoma and columnar cell mucinous carcinoma
  - Signet ring cell carcinoma
- Neuroendocrine tumours
  - Solid neuroendocrine carcinoma (carcinoid of the breast)
  - Atypical carcinoid tumor
  - Small cell / oat cell carcinoma
  - Large cell neuroendocrine carcinoma
- Invasive papillary carcinoma
- Invasive micropapillary carcinoma
- Pure apocrine carcinoma of the breast
- Apocrine-like invasive carcinoma
- Metaplastic carcinomas
  - Pure epithelial metaplastic carcinomas
    - Squamous cell carcinoma
    - Adenocarcinoma with spindle cell metaplasia
    - Adenosquamous carcinoma
    - Mucoepidermoid carcinoma
  - Mixed epithelial/mesenchymal metaplastic carcinomas
- (Other well-accepted subtypes of metaplastic mammary carcinoma thought to have clinical significance but not included in the decade old WHO classification:
  - Matrix-producing carcinoma
  - Spindle cell carcinoma
  - Carcinosarcoma
  - Squamous cell carcinoma of mammary origin
  - Metaplastic carcinoma with osteoclastic giant cells)
- Lipid-rich carcinoma
- Secretory carcinoma
- Oncocytic carcinoma
- Adenoid cystic carcinoma
- Acinic cell carcinoma
- Glycogen-rich clear cell carcinoma
- Sebaceous carcinoma
- Inflammatory carcinoma
- Bilateral breast carcinoma

Mesenchymal tumors (including sarcoma)

- Hemangioma
- Angiomatosis
- Hemangiopericytoma
- Pseudoangiomatous stromal hyperplasia
- Myofibroblastoma
- Fibromatosis (aggressive)
- Inflammatory myofibroblastic tumor
- Lipoma
  - Angiolipoma
- Granular cell tumour
- Neurofibroma
- Schwannoma
- Angiosarcoma
- Liposarcoma
- Rhabdomyosarcoma
- Osteosarcoma
- Leiomyoma
- Leiomyosarcoma

Tumors of the male breast

- Gynecomastia (benign)
- Carcinoma (See Male breast cancer section on types of breast cancer)
  - In situ
  - Invasive

Malignant lymphoma

- Non-Hodgkin lymphoma

Metastatic tumors to the breast from other places in the body

Precursor lesions

- Lobular neoplasia
  - lobular carcinoma in situ
- Intraductal proliferative lesions
  - Usual ductal hyperplasia
  - Flat epithelial hyperplasia
  - Atypical ductal hyperplasia
  - Ductal carcinoma in situ
  - Apocrine ductal carcinoma in situ
- Microinvasive carcinoma
- Intraductal papillary neoplasms
  - Central papilloma
  - Peripheral papilloma
  - Atypical papilloma
  - Intraductal papillary carcinoma
  - Intracystic papillary carcinoma

Benign epithelial lesions

- Adenosis, including variants
  - Sclerosing adenosis
  - Apocrine adenosis
  - Blunt duct adenosis
  - Microglandular adenosis
  - Adenomyoepithelial adenosis
- Radial scar / complex sclerosing lesion
- Adenomas
  - Tubular adenoma
  - Lactating adenoma
  - Apocrine adenoma
  - Pleomorphic adenoma
  - Ductal adenoma

Myoepithelial lesions

- Myoepitheliosis
- Adenomyoepithelial adenosis
- Adenomyoepithelioma
- Malignant myoepithelioma

Fibroepithelial tumours

- Fibroadenoma
- Phyllodes tumour
  - Benign
  - Borderline
  - Malignant
- Periductal stromal sarcoma, low-grade
- Mammary hamartoma

Benign tumors of the nipple

- Nipple adenoma
- Syringomatous adenoma
- Paget's disease of the nipple

Malignant tumors of the nipple

- Malignant Paget's disease of the nipple

== Grade ==
The grading of a cancer in the breast depends on the microscopic similarity of breast cancer cells to normal breast tissue, and classifies the cancer as well differentiated (low-grade), moderately differentiated (intermediate-grade), and poorly differentiated (high-grade), reflecting progressively less normal appearing cells that have a worsening prognosis. Although grading is fundamentally based on how biopsied, cultured cells behave, in practice the grading of a given cancer is derived by assessing the cellular appearance of the tumor. The closer the appearance of the cancer cells to normal cells, the slower their growth and the better the prognosis. If cells are not well differentiated, they will appear immature, will divide more rapidly, and will tend to spread. Well differentiated is given a grade of 1, moderate is grade 2, while poor or undifferentiated is given a higher grade of 3 or 4 (depending upon the scale used).

The Nottingham system is recommended for breast cancer grading. The Nottingham system is also called the Bloom–Richardson–Elston system (BRE), or the Elston-Ellis modification of the Scarff-Bloom-Richardson grading system. It grades breast carcinomas by adding up scores for tubule formation, nuclear pleomorphism, and mitotic count, each of which is given 1 to 3 points. The scores for each of these three criteria are then added together to give an overall final score and corresponding grade. It is not applicable to medullary carcinomas which are histologically high-grade by definition, while being clinically low-grade if lymph nodes are negative. It is also not applicable to metaplastic carcinomas.

The grading criteria are as follows:

=== Tubule formation ===
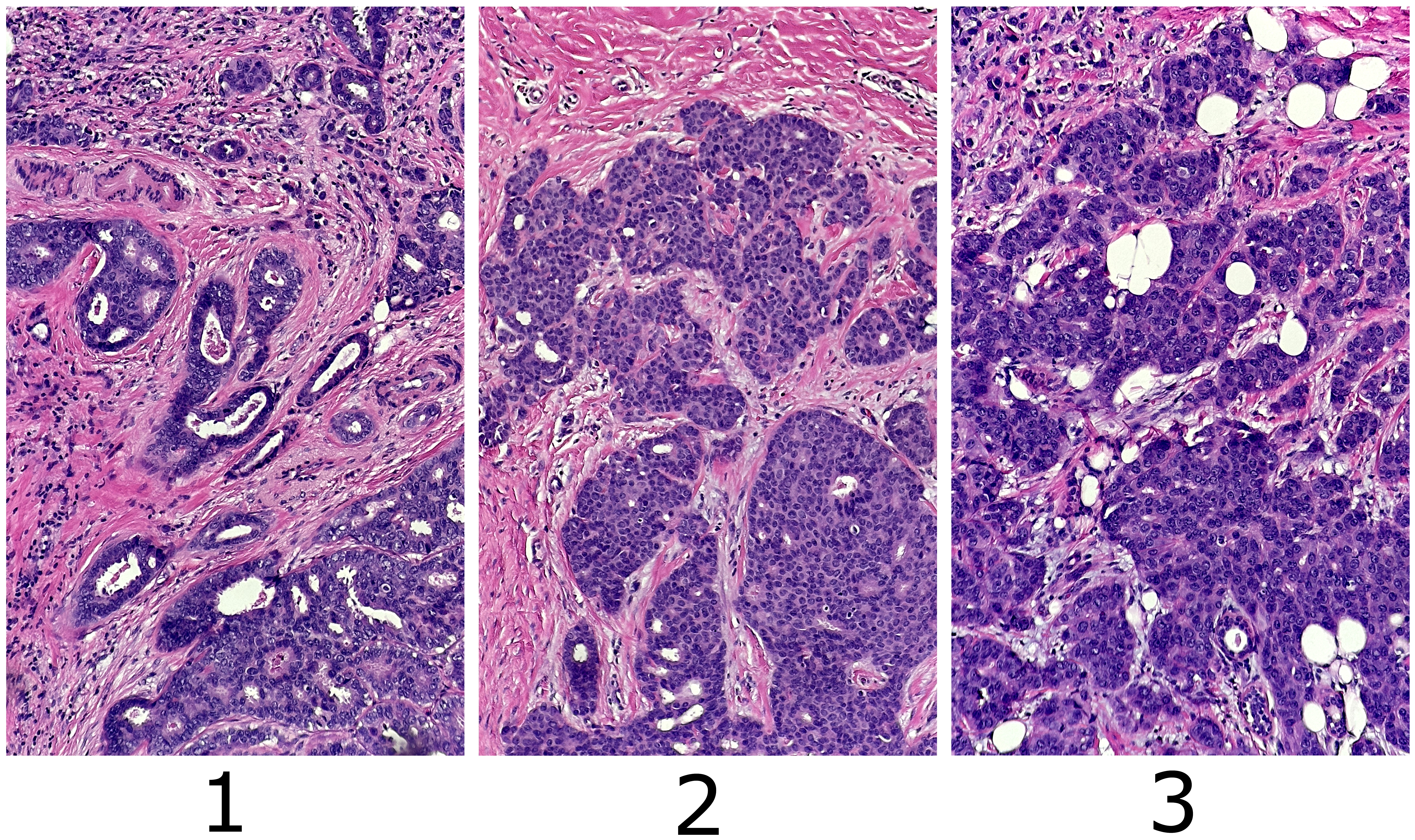
Tubule formation score in the Nottingham system: 1. A cribriform pattern also counts as tubules; 2. Between 10 and 75% of tumor is tubule forming.; 3. Almost all clear (white) spaces here are entrapped fat cells which do not count as tubules.

This parameter assesses what percent of the tumor forms normal duct structures. In cancer, there is a breakdown of the mechanisms that cells use to attach to each other and communicate with each other, to form tissues such as ducts, so the tissue structures become less orderly.

Note: The overall appearance of the tumor has to be considered.

- 1 point: tubular formation in more than 75% of the tumor (it may in addition be termed "majority of tumor")
- 2 points: tubular formation in 10 to 75% of the tumor ("moderate")
- 3 points: tubular formation in less than 10% of the tumor ("little or none")

=== Nuclear pleomorphism ===
This parameter assesses whether the cell nuclei are uniform like those in normal breast duct epithelial cells, or whether they are larger, darker, or irregular (pleomorphic). In cancer, the mechanisms that control genes and chromosomes in the nucleus break down, and irregular nuclei and pleomorphic changes are signs of abnormal cell reproduction.

Note: The cancer areas having cells with the greatest cellular abnormalities should be evaluated.

- 1 point: nuclei with minimal or mild variation in size and shape
- 2 points: nuclei with moderate variation in size and shape
- 3 points: nuclei with marked variation in size and shape
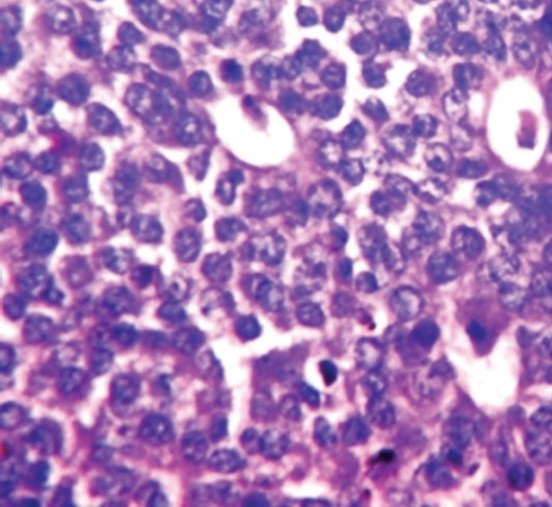
Ductal carcinoma with mild nuclear pleomorphism

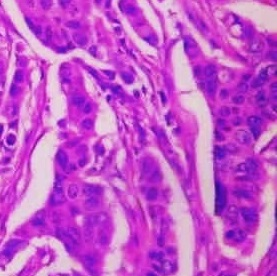
Invasive ductal carcinoma with moderate nuclear pleomorphism

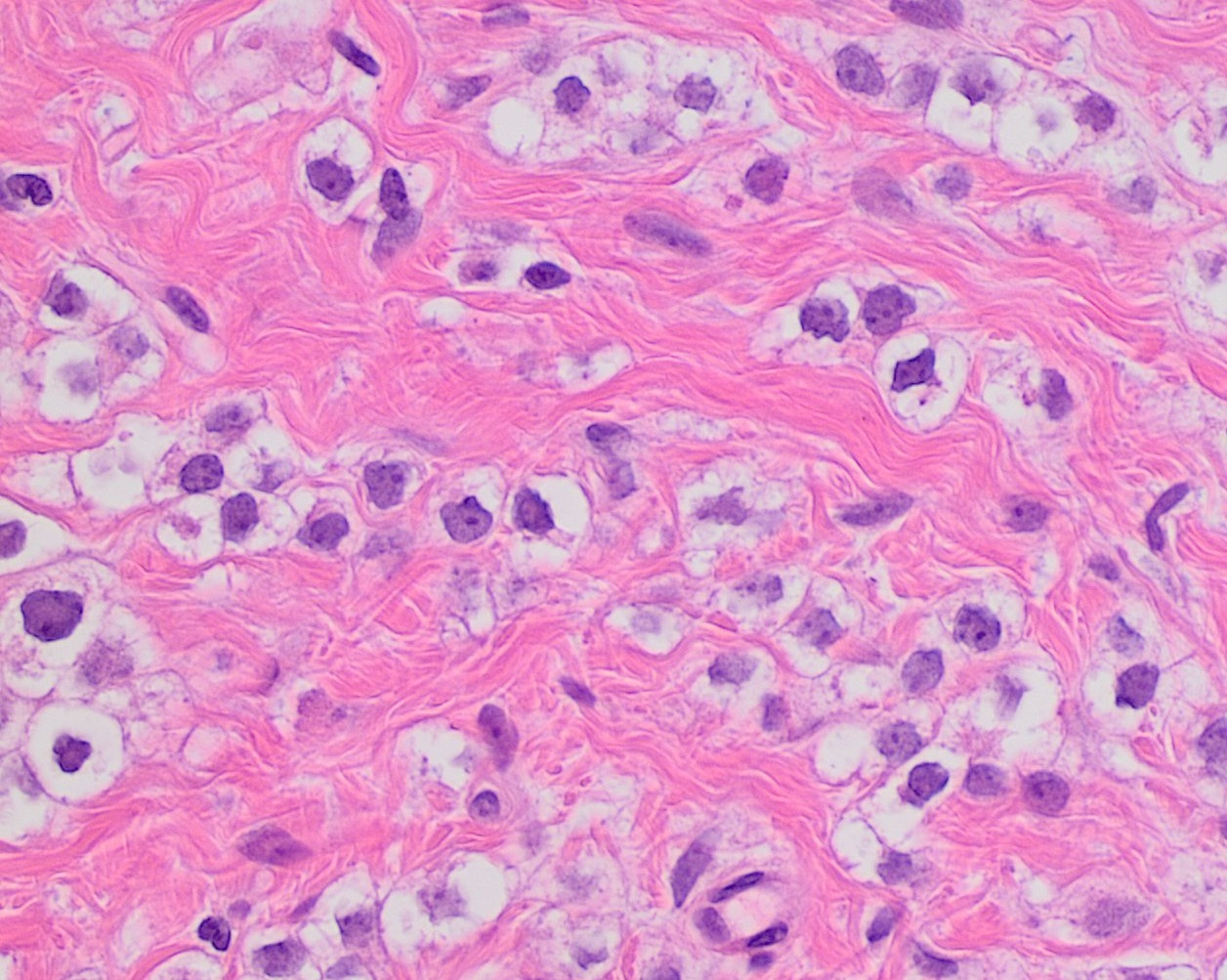
Invasive lobular carcinoma with moderate nuclear pleomorphism

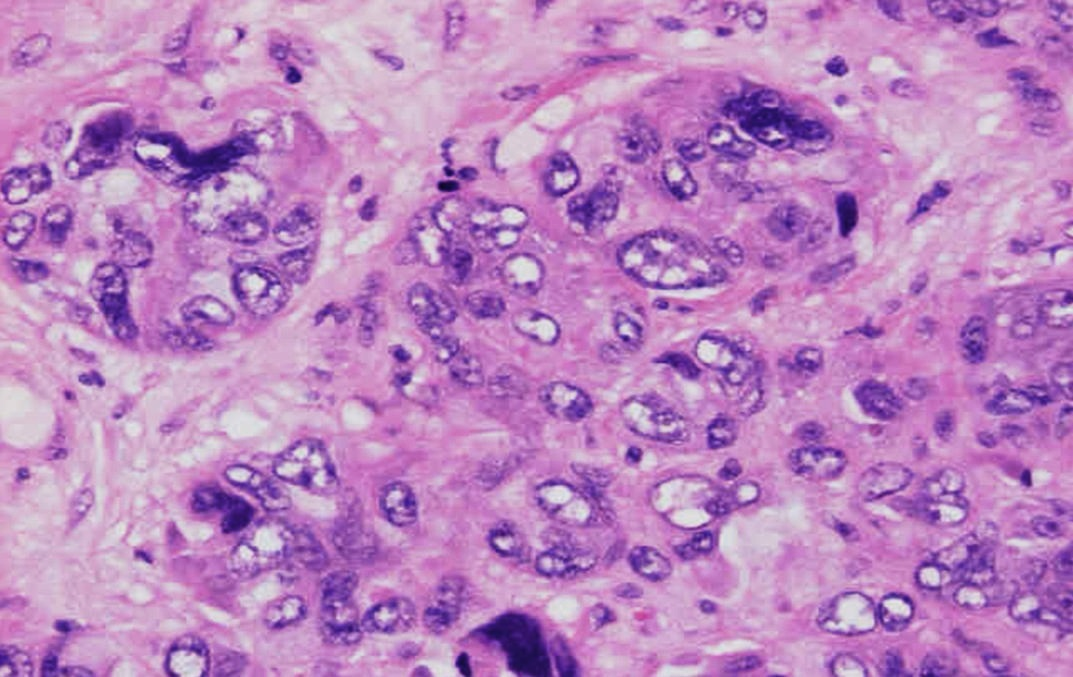
Invasive ductal carcinoma with marked nuclear pleomorphism

=== Mitotic count ===
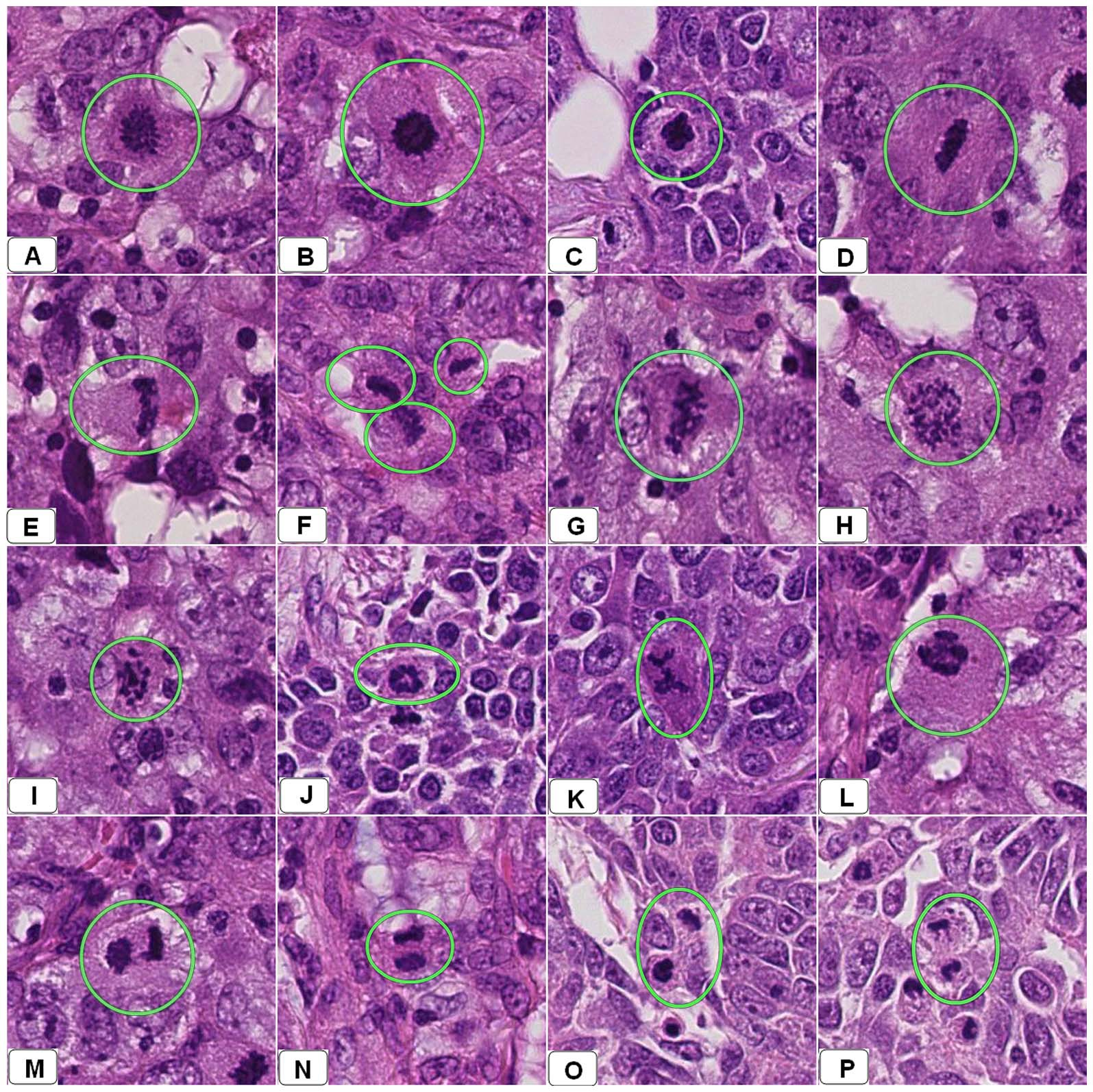
Mitosis appearances in breast cancer

This parameter assesses how many mitotic figures (dividing cells) the pathologist sees in 10x high power microscope field. One of the hallmarks of cancer is that cells divide uncontrollably. The more cells that are dividing, the worse the cancer.

Note: Mitotic figures are counted only at the periphery of the tumor, and counting should begin in the most mitotically active areas.

Mitotic count per 10 high-power fields (HPFs)
Area per HPF					Score
0.096 mm^{2} (Note: Area per high-power field for some microscope types: Olympus BX50, BX40 or BH2 or AO or Nikon with 15x eyepiece: 0.096 mm^{2}; AO with 10x eyepiece: 0.12 mm^{2}; Nikon or Olympus with 10x eyepiece: 0.16 mm^{2}; Leitz Ortholux: 0.27 mm^{2}; Leitz Diaplan: 0.31 mm^{2}; "Infiltrating Ductal Carcinoma of the Breast (Carcinoma of No Special Type)". Stanford University School of Medicine. Archived from the original on 11 September 2019.)	0.12 mm^{2}	0.16 mm^{2}	0.27 mm^{2}	0.31 mm^{2}	Score
0-3	0-4	0-5	0-9	0-11	1
4-7	5-8	6-10	10-19	12-22	2
>7	>8	>10	>19	>22	3

=== Overall grade ===
The scores for each of these three criteria are added together to give a final overall score and a corresponding grade as follows:

- 3-5 Grade 1 tumor (well-differentiated). Best prognosis.
- 6-7 Grade 2 tumor (moderately differentiated). Medium prognosis.
- 8-9 Grade 3 tumor (poorly differentiated). Worst prognosis.

Lower-grade tumors, with a more favorable prognosis, can be treated less aggressively, and have a better survival rate. Higher-grade tumors are treated more aggressively, and their intrinsically worse survival rate may warrant the adverse effects of more aggressive medications.

== Stage ==
Breast cancer stages

Staging is the process of determining how much cancer there is in the body and where it is located. The underlying purpose of staging is to describe the extent or severity of an individual's cancer, and to bring together cancers that have similar prognosis and treatment. Staging of breast cancer is one aspect of breast cancer classification that assists in making appropriate treatment choices, when considered along with other classification aspects such as estrogen receptor and progesterone receptor levels in the cancer tissue, the human epidermal growth factor receptor 2 (HER2/neu) status, menopausal status, and the person's general health.

Staging information that is obtained prior to surgery, for example by mammography, x-rays and CT scans, is called clinical staging and staging by surgery is known as pathological staging.

Pathologic staging is more accurate than clinical staging, but clinical staging is the first and sometimes the only staging type. For example, if clinical staging reveals stage IV disease, extensive surgery may not be helpful, and (appropriately) incomplete pathological staging information will be obtained.

The American Joint Committee on Cancer (AJCC) and the International Union Against Cancer (UICC) recommend TNM staging, which is a two step procedure. Their TNM system, which they now develop jointly, first classifies cancer by several factors, T for tumor, N for nodes, M for metastasis, and then groups these TNM factors into overall stages.

=== Primary Tumor (T) ===
Tumor – The tumor values (TX, T0, Tis, T1, T2, T3 or T4) depend on the cancer at the primary site of origin in the breast, as follows:

- TX: inability to assess that site
- Tis: ductal carcinoma in situ (DCIS), lobular carcinoma in situ (LCIS) or Paget's disease
- T1: Less than 2 cm

- T1a: 0.1 to 0.5 cm
- T1b: 0.5 to 1.0 cm
- T1c: 1.0 to 2.0 cm

- T2: 2 to 5 cm
- T3: Larger than 5 cm
- T4

- T4a: Chest wall involvement
- T4b: Skin involvement
- T4c: Both 4a and 4b
- T4d: Inflammatory breast cancer, a clinical circumstance where typical skin changes involve at least a third of the breast.

=== Regional Lymph Nodes (N) ===
Lymph Node – The lymph node values (NX, N0, N1, N2 or N3) depend on the number, size and location of breast cancer cell deposits in various regional lymph nodes, such as the armpit (axillary lymph nodes), the collar area (supraclavicular lymph nodes), and inside the chest (internal mammary lymph nodes.) The armpit is designated as having three levels: level I is the low axilla, and is below or outside the lower edge of the pectoralis minor muscle; level II is the mid-axilla which is defined by the borders of the pectoralis minor muscle; and level III, or high (apical) axilla which is above the pectoralis minor muscle. Each stage is as follows:

- N0: There is some nuance to the official definitions for N0 disease, which includes:

- N0(i+) : Isolated Tumor Cell clusters (ITC), which are small clusters of cells not greater than 0.2 mm, or single tumor cells, or a cluster of fewer than 200 cells in a single histologic cross-section, whether detected by routine histology or immunohistochemistry.
- N0(mol-): regional lymph nodes have no metastases histologically, but have positive molecular findings (RT-PCR).

- N1: Metastases in 1-3 axillary lymph nodes and/or in internal mammary nodes; and/or in clinically negative internal mammary nodes with micrometastasis, or macrometastasis on sentinel lymph node biopsy.

- N1mi: Micrometastasis, that is, lymph node clusters at least 2 mm or 200 cells, but less than 2.0 mm. At least one carcinoma focus over 2.0 mm is called "Lymph node metastasis". If one node qualifies as metastasis, all other nodes even with smaller foci are counted as metastases as well.

- N2: Fixed/matted ipsilateral axillary nodes.
- N3

- N3a – Ipsilateral infraclavicular nodes
- N3b – Ipsilateral internal mammary nodes
- N3c – Ipsilateral supraclavicular nodes

=== Distant Metastases (M) ===
- M0: No clinical or radiographic evidence of distant metastases
- M0(i+): Molecularly or microscopically detected tumor cells in circulating blood, bone marrow or non-regional nodal tissue, no larger than 0.2 mm, and without clinical or radiographic evidence or symptoms or signs of metastases, and which, perhaps counter-intuitively, does not change the stage grouping, as staging for in M0(i+) is done according to the T and N values
- M1: Distant detectable metastases as determined by classic clinical and radiographic means, and/or metastasis that are histologically larger than 0.2 mm.

=== Overall stage ===
A combination of T, N and M, as follows:

- Stage 0: Tis
- Stage I: T1N0
- Stage II: T2N0, T3N0 T0N1, T1N1, or T2N1
- Stage III: Invasion into skin and/or ribs, matted lymph nodes, T3N1, T0N2, T1N2, T2N2, T3N2, AnyT N3, T4 any N, locally advanced breast cancer
- Stage IV: M1, advanced breast cancer

Breast cancer prognosis by stage
Stage	5-year survival
Stage 0	100%
Stage I	100%
Stage II	90%
Stage III	70%
Stage IV	30%

==== Staging and prognosis ====
The impact of different stages on outcome can be appreciated in the following table, taken from patient data in the 2013-2015 period, and using the AJCC 8th edition for staging. It does not show the influence of important additional factors such as estrogen receptor (ER) or HER2/neu receptor status, and does not reflect the impact of newer treatments.

==== Previous editions ====
Although TNM classification is an internationally agreed system, it has gradually evolved through its different editions; the dates of publication and of adoption for use of AJCC editions is summarized in the table in this article; past editions are available from AJCC for web download.

Several factors are important when reviewing reports for individual breast cancers or when reading the medical literature, and applying staging data.

AJCC edition	published	went into effect	Breast cancer link(s) and page numbers in the original
7	2009	2010	AJCC or NCI
6	2002	2003	AJCC; original pages 223–240
5	1997	1998	AJCC; original pages 171–180
4	1992	1993	AJCC; original pages 149–154
3	1988	1989	AJCC; original pages 145–150
2	1983	1984	AJCC; original pages 127–134
1	1977	1978	AJCC; original pages 101–108

It is crucial to be aware that the TNM system criteria have varied over time, sometimes fairly substantially, according to the different editions that AJCC and UICC have released. Readers are assisted by the provision in the table of direct links to the breast cancer chapters of these various editions.

As a result, a given stage may have quite a different prognosis depending on which staging edition is used, independent of any changes in diagnostic methods or treatments, an effect that can contribute to "stage migration". For example, differences in the 1998 and 2003 categories resulted in many cancers being assigned differently, with apparent improvement in survival rates.

As a practical matter, reports often use the staging edition that was in place when the study began, rather than the date of acceptance or publication. However, it is worth checking whether the author updated the staging system during the study, or modified the usual classification rules for specific use in the investigation.

A different effect on staging arises from evolving technologies that are used to assign patients to particular categories, such that increasingly sensitive methods tend to cause individual cancers to be reassigned to higher stages, making it improper to compare that cancer's prognosis to the historical expectations for that stage.

Finally, of course, a further important consideration is the effect of improving treatments over time as well.

Previous editions featured three metastatic values (MX, M0 and M1) which referred respectively to absence of adequate information, the confirmed absence, or the presence of breast cancer cells in locations other than the breast and regional lymph nodes, such as to bone, brain, lung.

AJCC has provided web accessible poster versions of the current versions of these copyrighted TNM descriptors and groups, and readers should refer to that up to date, accurate information or to the National Cancer Institute (NCI) or National Comprehensive Cancer Network sites which reprints these with AJCC permission.

For accurate, complete, current details refer to the accessible copyrighted documentation from AJCC, or to the authorized documentation from NCI or NCCN; for past editions refer to AJCC.

== Receptor status ==
The receptor status of breast cancers has traditionally been identified by immunohistochemistry (IHC), which stains the cells based on the presence of estrogen receptors (ER), progesterone receptors (PR) and HER2. This remains the most common method of testing for receptor status, but DNA multi-gene expression profiles can categorize breast cancers into molecular subtypes that generally correspond to IHC receptor status; one commercial source is the BluePrint test, as discussed in the following section.

Receptor status is a critical assessment for all breast cancers as it determines the suitability of using targeted treatments such as tamoxifen and or trastuzumab. These treatments are now some of the most effective adjuvant treatments of breast cancer. Estrogen receptor positive (ER+) cancer cells depend on estrogen for their growth, so they can be treated with drugs to reduce either the effect of estrogen (e.g. tamoxifen) or the actual level of estrogen (e.g. aromatase inhibitors), and generally have a better prognosis. Generally, prior to modern treatments, HER+ had a worse prognosis, however HER2+ cancer cells respond to drugs such as the monoclonal antibody, trastuzumab, (in combination with conventional chemotherapy) and this has improved the prognosis significantly. Conversely, triple negative cancer (i.e. no positive receptors), lacking targeted treatments, now has a comparatively poor prognosis.

Androgen receptor is expressed in 80-90% of ER+ breast cancers and 40% of "triple negative" breast cancers. Activation of androgen receptors appears to suppress breast cancer growth in ER+ cancer while in ER- breast it appears to act as growth promoter. Efforts are underway to utilize this as prognostic marker and treatment.

=== Molecular subtype ===
Receptor status was traditionally considered by reviewing each individual receptor (ER, PR, HER2) in turn, but newer approaches look at these together, along with the tumor grade, to categorize breast cancer into several conceptual molecular classes that have different prognoses and may have different responses to specific therapies. DNA microarrays have assisted this approach, as discussed in the following section. Proposed molecular subtypes include:

- Basal-like: ER-, PR- and HER2-; also called triple negative breast cancer (TNBC). Most BRCA1 breast cancers are basal-like TNBC.
- Luminal A: ER+ and low grade
- Luminal B: ER+ but often high grade
- Luminal ER-/AR+: (overlapping with apocrine and so called molecular apocrine) - recently identified androgen responsive subtype which may respond to antihormonal treatment with bicalutamide
- ERBB2/HER2-amplified: has overexpressed HER2/neu
- Normal breast-like
- Claudin-low: a more recently described class; often triple-negative, but distinct in that there is low expression of cell-cell junction proteins including E-cadherin and frequently there is infiltration with lymphocytes.

Comparison of molecular subtypes of breast cancer.
	Luminal A	Luminal B	ERBB2/HER2-amplified	Basal-like
Overall gene expression	High expression of: Luminal epithelial genes; ER-related genes	Compared to Luminal A, higher expression of: Proliferation-related genes; HER2-related genes; Lower expression of: Luminal epithelial genes; ER-related genes	High expression of HER2-related genes; Low expression of ER-related genes	High expression of: Basal epithelial-related genes; proliferation-related genes; Low expression of: HER2-related genes; ER-related genes
Light microscopy types	Tubular carcinoma; Low grade invasive ductal carcinoma; Classic invasive lobular carcinoma	Invasive ductal carcinoma; Micropapillary carcinoma; Pleomorphic invasive lobular carcinoma	High grade invasive ductal carcinoma; Pleomorphic invasive lobular carcinoma	High grade invasive ductal carcinoma; Metaplastic carcinoma; Medullary carcinoma; Adenoid cystic carcinoma
Immunohistochemistry	Estrogen receptor positive; Progesterone receptor positive in at least 20% of cases; HER2 negative; Low Ki-67	Estrogen receptor positive; Progesterone receptor positive in less than 20% of cases; HER2 positive or high Ki-67	HER2 positive; Estrogen and progesterone receptor negative	HER2, estrogen and progesterone receptor negative
Gene mutations	PI3KCA; MAPK3K1; GATA3; CCDN1 amplification	Similar to luminal A but: TP53 inactivation; Rb inactivation; Myc-related transcription; FOXM1-related transcription	HER2 amplicon and corresponding signaling pathway signature	TP53; RB1 loss; BRCA1 loss; MYC amplification; PI3K/AKT pathway oversignaling

== DNA classification ==
=== Traditional DNA classification ===
Traditional DNA classification was based on the general observation that cells that are dividing more quickly have a worse prognosis, and relied on either the presence of protein Ki-67 or the percentage of cancer cell DNA in S phase. These methods, and scoring systems that used DNA ploidy, are used much less often now, as their predictive and prognostic power was less substantial than other classification schemes such as the TNM stage. In contrast, modern DNA analyses are increasingly relevant in defining underlying cancer biology and in helping choose treatments.

=== HER2/neu ===
HER2/neu status can be analyzed by fluorescent in-situ hybridization (FISH) assays. Some commentators prefer this approach, claiming a higher correlation than receptor immunohistochemistry with response to trastuzumab, a targeted therapy, but guidelines permit either testing method.

=== DNA microarrays ===
==== Background ====
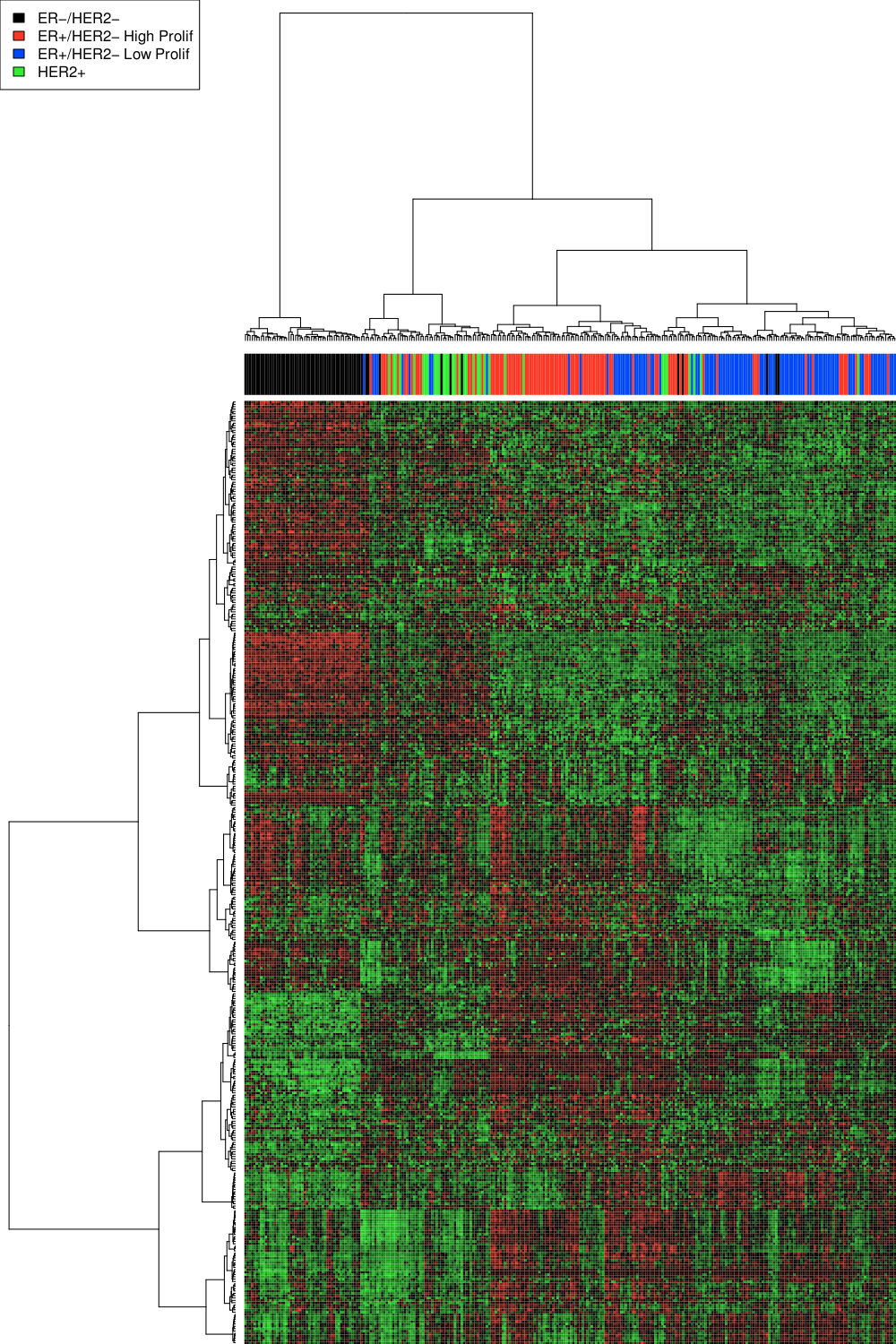
Molecular classification of breast cancer from mRNA expression profiles

DNA microarrays have compared normal cells to breast cancer cells and found differences in the expression of hundreds of genes. Although the significance of many of those genetic differences is unknown, independent analyses by different research groups has found that certain groups of genes have a tendency to co-express. These co-expressing clusters have included hormone receptor-related genes, HER2-related genes, a group of basal-like genes, and proliferation genes. As might therefore be anticipated, there is considerable similarity between the receptor and microarray classifications, but assignment of individual tumors is by no means identical. By way of illustration, some analyses have suggested that approximately 75% of receptor classified triple-negative breast cancers (TNBC) basal-like tumors have the expected DNA expression profile, and a similar 75% of tumors with a typical basal-like DNA expression profile are receptor TNBC as well. To say this in a different way to emphasize things, this means that 25% of triple-negative breast cancer (TNBC) basal-like tumors as defined by one or other classification are excluded from the alternative classification's results. Which classification scheme (receptor IHC or DNA expression profile) more reliably assorts particular cancers to effective therapies is under investigation.

== Prognostic and predictive tests ==
In the early 2000s, several prognostic and predictive assays were introduced as a result of research on gene expression profiling. The purpose of these tests is to stratify breast cancer patients based on their risk of recurrence, and drive decisions about adjuvant therapies. Currently, multiple such tools are used in clinical practice globally. All prognostic and predictive tools in breast cancer use machine learning methods that predict patient outcomes based on biomarkers, such as transcriptomics, tumor morphology, or basic clinicopathologic features. The most commonly used are:

- Oncotype DX (Genomic Health) was developed in 2003 for use in estrogen receptor (ER) positive tumors, and has been endorsed by the ASCO and the NCCN guidelines for prognostication and chemotherapy benefit prediction in ER-positive HER2-negative early breast cancer.
- MammaPrint (Agendia) can be performed in estrogen receptor (ER) positive and negative tumors, and is a FDA-cleared device. MammaPrint is validated and endorsed by NCCN guidelines as a prognostic test. MammaPrint is often accompanied by BluePrint, a 80-gene subtyping test classifying patients into luminal-type, HER2-type, or basal-type cancers.
- Breast Cancer Index (Hologic) was developed for prediction of late cancer recurrence and extended endocrine therapy benefit in ER-positive HER2-negative breast cancer. As of 2026, Breast Cancer Index is the only gene expression assay endorsed by NCCN guidelines for prediction of benefit of extended endocrine therapy.
- Ataraxis Breast (Ataraxis AI) uses artificial intelligence to predict risk of cancer recurrence, response to adjuvant chemotherapy, and response to neoadjuvant therapies in early-stage breast cancer based on digital pathology imaging.
- Prosigna (Veracyte) is a 50-gene gene expression profiling assay for patients with ER-positive, HER2-negative node-negative or node-positive patients. Prosigna was validated in the TransATAC translational study to be prognostic of distant recurrence.
- EndoPredict/EPclin (Myriad Genetics) is a 12-gene expression profiling assay for patients with ER-positive and HER2-negative breast cancer. EndoPredict/EPclin was found to be prognostic of distant recurrence in ABCSG 6/8 and TransATAC studies.

The majority of these tests have been scientifically reviewed to compare them with other standard prognostic biomarkers, such as grade and receptor status. Although these gene-expression profiles look at different individual genes, they seem to classify a given tumor into similar risk groups and thus provide concordant predictions of outcome.

Although there is considerable evidence that these tests can refine the treatment decisions in a meaningful proportion of breast cancers they are fairly expensive; proposed selection criteria for which particular tumors may benefit by being interrogated by these assays remain controversial, particularly with lymph node positive cancers. One review characterized these genetic tests collectively as adding "modest prognostic information for patients with HER2-positive and triple-negative tumors, but when measures of clinical risk are equivocal (e.g., intermediate expression of ER and intermediate histologic grade), these assays could guide clinical decisions".

=== Oncotype DX ===
Oncotype DX assesses 16 cancer-related genes and 5 normal comparator reference genes, and is therefore sometimes known as the 21-gene assay. It was designed for use in estrogen receptor (ER) positive tumors. The test is run on formalin fixed, paraffin-embedded tissue. Oncotype results are reported as a recurrence score (RS), where a higher RS is associated with a worse prognosis, referring to the likelihood of recurrence without treatment. In addition to that prognostic role, a higher RS was found in translational studies of Phase III randomized controlled trials to be significantly associated with a higher probability of response to chemotherapy. In these secondary analyses, patients with low Oncotype RS were found to derive minimal benefit from adjuvant chemotherapy, suggesting it may be appropriate to choose to avoid side effects from that additional treatment. As an additional example, a neoadjuvant clinical treatment program that included initial chemotherapy followed by surgery and subsequent additional chemotherapy, radiotherapy, and hormonal therapy found a strong correlation of the Oncotype classification with the likelihood of a complete response (CR) to the presurgical chemotherapy.

Since high risk features may already be evident in many high risk cancers, for example hormone-receptor negativity or HER-2 positive disease, the Oncotype test may especially improve the risk assessment that is derived from routine clinical variables in intermediate risk disease. Results from both the US and internationally suggest that Oncotype may assist in treatment decisions.

Oncotype DX has been endorsed by the American Society of Clinical Oncology (ASCO) and the National Comprehensive Cancer Network (NCCN). The NCCN Panel considers the 21-gene assay as an option when evaluating certain tumors to assist in estimating likelihood of recurrence and benefit from chemotherapy, emphasizing that the recurrence score should be used along with other breast cancer classification elements when stratifying risk.

Similar to most prognostic assays, Oncotype DX is offered as a laboratory-developed test through a CLIA-certified laboratory, and is not approved by the FDA.

=== MammaPrint and BluePrint ===
MammaPrint is a 70-gene panel marketed by Agendia, developed in patients under age 55 years who had lymph node negative breast cancers (N0). The commercial test is marketed for use in breast cancer irrespective of estrogen receptor (ER) status. The test is run on formalin fixed, paraffin-embedded tissue. MammaPrint traditionally used rapidly frozen tissue but a room temperature, molecular fixative is available for use within 60 minutes of obtaining fresh tissue samples.

A summary of clinical trials using MammaPrint is included in the MammaPrint main article. MammaPrint was first approved for clinical use by the FDA in 2007. To be eligible for the MammaPrint gene expression profile, a breast cancer should have the following characteristics: stage 1 or 2, tumor size less than 5.0 cm, estrogen receptor positive (ER+) or estrogen receptor negative (ER-). In the US, the tumor should also be lymph node negative (N0), but internationally the test may be performed if the lymph node status is negative or positive with up to 3 nodes.

MammaPrint has been validated in a prospective Phase III randomized controlled trial, MINDACT and a prospective registry study, FLEX. Several clinical trials are ongoing investigating the role of MammaPrint in additional treatment settings, including neoadjuvant therapy.

One method of assessing the molecular subtype of a breast cancer is by BluePrint, a commercial-stage 80-gene panel marketed by Agendia, either as a standalone test, or combined with the MammaPrint gene profile. BluePrint classifies breast tumors into luminal-type, HER2-type or basal-type.

=== Other prognostic and predictive tests ===
Given the limitations of gene expression profiling tests, such as long turnaround times and high costs, statistical models and more complex artificial intelligence models were developed to stratify recurrence risk and predict treatment response.

In years 2000-2020, several online calculators and nomograms were developed, including Adjuvant!,, Magee Equations, PREDICT, and CTS5. Recently, artificial intelligence tests analyzing H&E-stained pathology slides were shown to potentially improve on the accuracy of gene expression profiling tests and expand clinical utility. In real-world retrospective studies, Ataraxis Breast was found to have higher accuracy in predicting recurrence risk than Oncotype DX and refine selection of patients eligible for adjuvant CDK4/6 inhibitors.

== Other breast cancer treatment biomarkers ==
Several biomarkers and companion diagnostics exist that are associated with relative resistance or sensitivity to specific treatment options. Various molecular pathway targets and DNA results are being incorporated in the design of clinical trials of new medicines. Specific genes such as p53, NME1, BRCA and PIK3CA/Akt may be associated with responsiveness of the cancer cells to innovative research pharmaceuticals. BRCA1 and BRCA2 polymorphic variants can increase the risk of breast cancer, and these cancers tend to express a profile of genes, such as p53, in a pattern that has been called "BRCA-ness." Cancers arising from BRCA1 and BRCA2 mutations, as well as other cancers that share a similar "BRCA-ness" profile, including some basal-like receptor triple negative breast cancers, may respond to treatment with PARP inhibitors such as olaparib. Combining these newer medicines with older agents such as 6-Thioguanine (6TG) may overcome the resistance that can arise in BRCA cancers to PARP inhibitors or platinum-based chemotherapy. mTOR inhibitors such as everolimus may show more effect in PIK3CA/Akt e9 mutants than in e20 mutants or wild types. Capivasertib and alpelisib were approved in the United States for patients with PIK3CA-mutated advanced or metastatic breast cancer following results of positive CAPItello-291 and SOLAR-1 clinical trials. Patients with ESR1 mutations are candidates for novel targeted therapies, such as camizestrant or imlunestrant.

Topoisomerase II (TOP2A) expression predicts whether doxorubicin is relatively useful. Expression of genes that regulate tubulin may help predict the activity of taxanes.

DNA methylation patterns can epigenetically affect gene expression in breast cancer and may contribute to some of the observed differences between genetic subtypes.

Tumors overexpressing the Wnt signaling pathway co-receptor low-density lipoprotein receptor-related protein 6 (LRP6) may represent a distinct subtype of breast cancer and a potential treatment target.

Numerous clinical investigations looked at whether testing for variant genotype polymorphic alleles of several genes could predict whether or not to prescribe tamoxifen; this was based on possible differences in the rate of conversion of tamoxifen to the active metabolite, endoxifen. Although some studies had suggested a potential advantage from CYP2D6 testing, data from two large clinical trials found no benefit. Testing for the CYP2C19*2 polymorphism gave counterintuitive results. The medical utility of potential biomarkers of tamoxifen responsiveness such as HOXB13, PAX2, and estrogen receptor (ER) alpha and beta isoforms interaction with SRC3 have all yet to be fully defined.
