= Symphony (Agendia) =

Combination of breast cancer tests

Symphony is a suite of assays that analyze hundreds of genes in an individual breast cancer. The test is marketed by Agendia. The results aid physicians in deciding appropriate treatment for each patient.

There are four breast cancer tests within the Symphony suite:

- MammaPrint, which assists physicians and patients in complex chemotherapy decisions by giving a clear and unambiguous high or low result of the risk of metastasis during the period when chemotherapy is effective (the first five years after diagnosis);
- TargetPrint, which identifies the presence of certain receptors and helps identify patient candidates for hormonal treatment and targeted therapies;
- BluePrint, which identifies three different biological subgroups that react to specific therapies in different ways;
