= Mucinous carcinoma of the breast =

- Other names: Colloid carcinoma of the breast
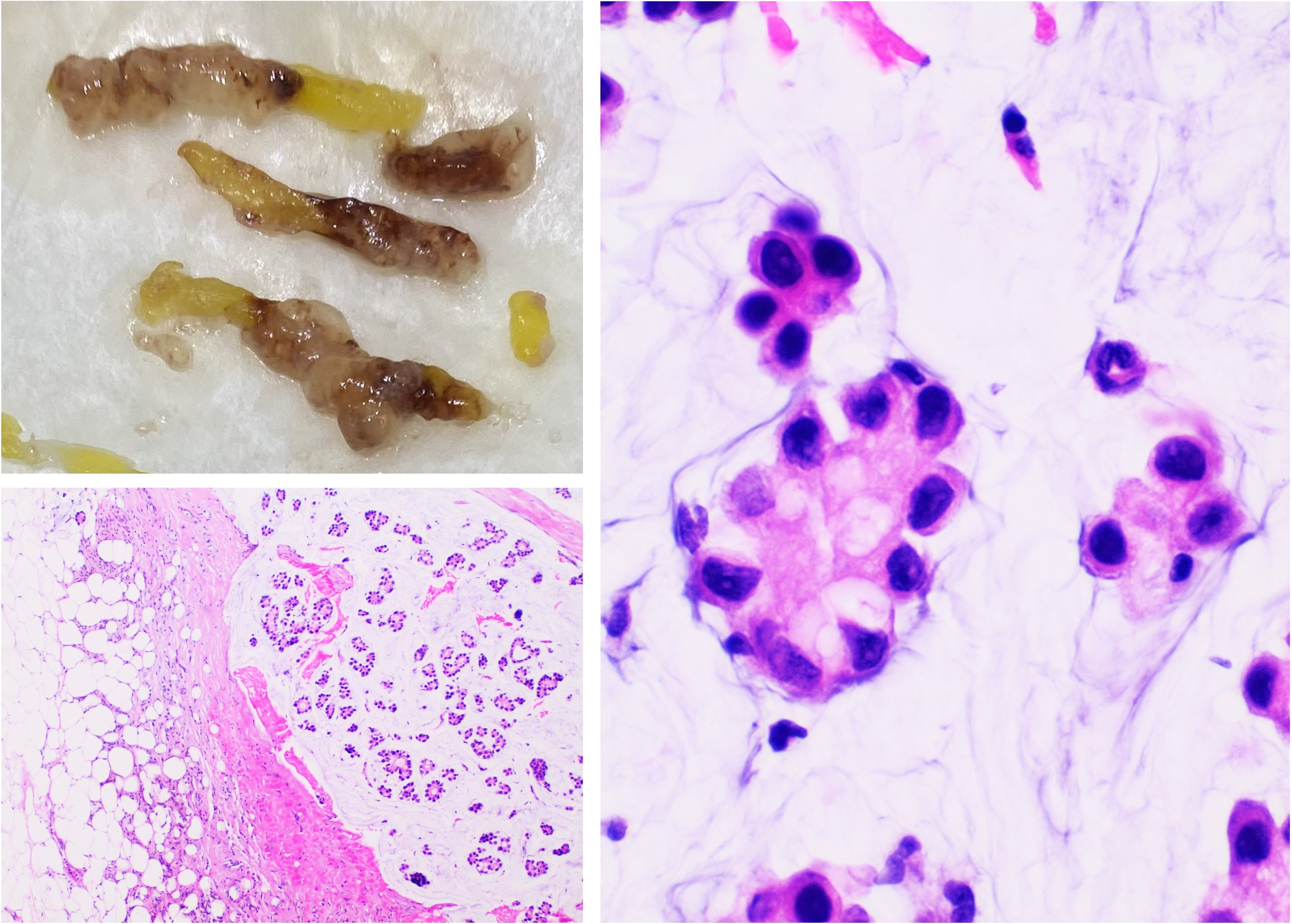
- Gross pathology (upper left) of biopsies of mucinous carcinoma shows gelatinous areas. Histopathology shows clusters or nests of tumor cells floating in pools of extracellular mucin.
- Specialty: Oncology, Breast surgery
- Symptoms: Colloid carcinoma, gelatinous carcinoma, mucoid carcinoma, mucinous adenocarcinoma

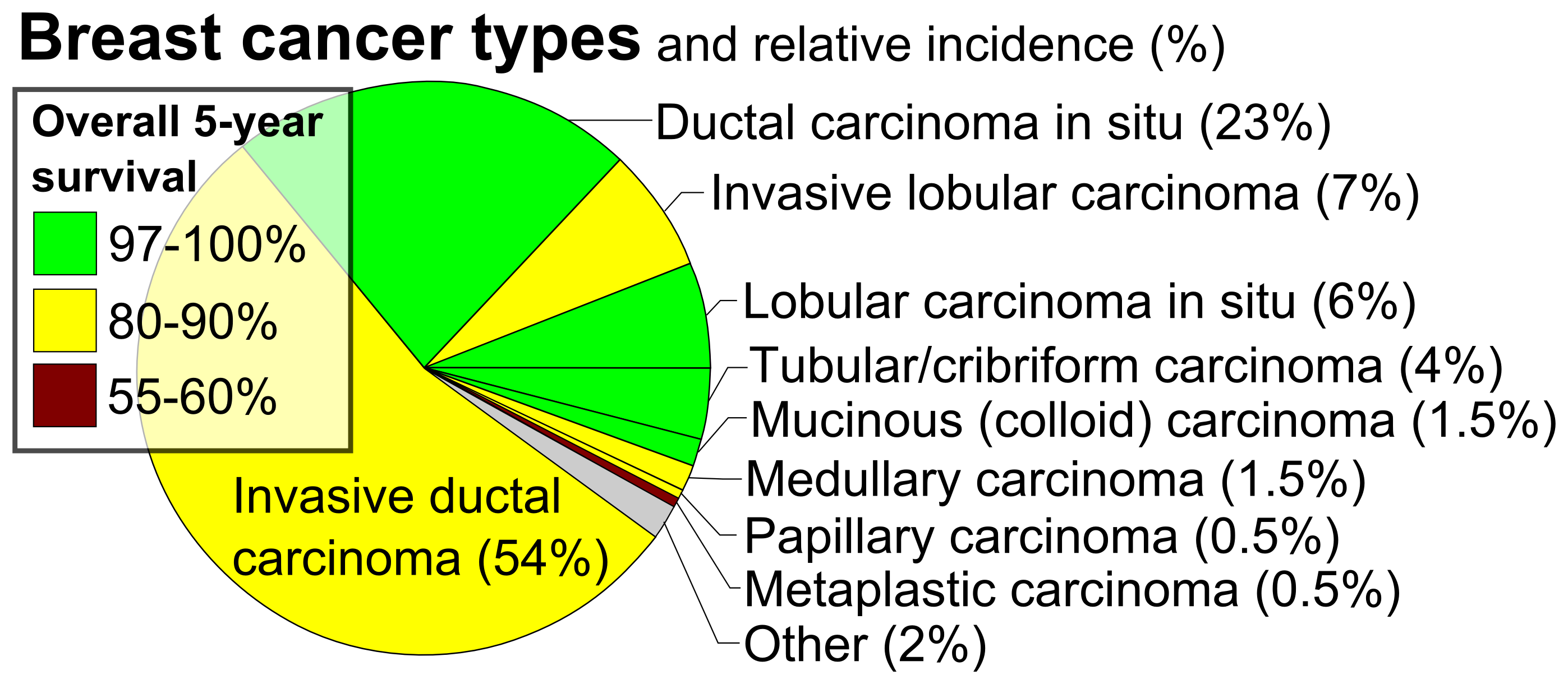
Histopathologic types of breast cancer, with relative incidences and prognoses, with "mucinous (colloid) carcinoma" at right.

Mucinous carcinoma of the breast is a form of mucinous carcinoma and a breast cancer type. It is a rare form of breast cancer that accounts for 2% of breast carcinomas and most commonly occurs in postmenopausal women over 70 years old. Rare cases of this carcinoma have been diagnosed in men (see male breast cancer).

== Diagnosis ==
Mucinous carcinoma of the breast grows slowly and can become a large size before diagnosis. Late diagnosis is also due to how the mucinous contents of the tumor don't feel solid. Mammography, ultrasound, MRI, and tissue biopsy are often employed to diagnose mucinous breast carcinoma.

== Prognosis ==
With a 5-year survival rate of 81% to 94%, mucinous breast cancer tends to have a good prognosis. There is also a low incidence of metastasis to lymph nodes. Pure mucinous carcinoma has a more favorable prognosis compared to mixed type mucinous carcinoma.
