= Nipple adenoma =

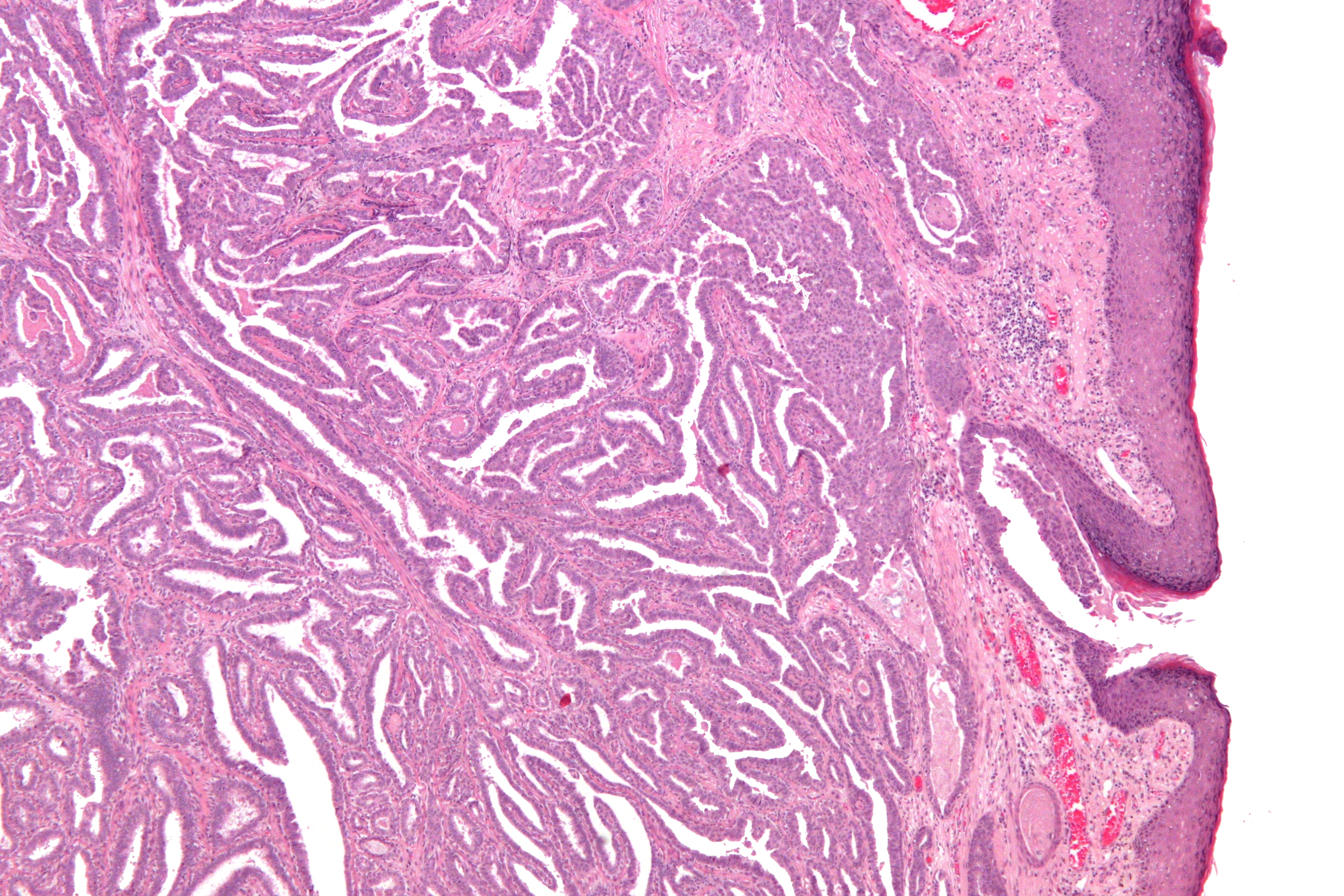
- Micrograph of a nipple adenoma. H&E stain.
- Specialty: Oncology

A nipple adenoma is a rare benign tumour of the breast.

The condition may also be known as :

- Florid papillomatosis of the nipple
- Florid adenomatosis
- Subareolar duct papillomatosis
- Erosive adenomatosis

== Signs and symptoms ==
Nipple adenomas may be felt as a lump under the nipple or areola. They may come to attention because of nipple pain, ulceration, swelling or discharge.

== Diagnosis ==
=== Definition ===
A nipple adenoma is a type of intraductal papilloma that arises within the lactiferous ducts that are located within the nipple.

=== Differential diagnosis ===
The microscopic appearance of a nipple adenoma can be mistaken for carcinoma. Other conditions that have similar symptoms and signs as nipple adenoma include Paget's disease of the breast, other intraductal papillomas, ductal carcinoma in situ (DCIS), syringomatous adenoma of the nipple and subareolar sclerosing duct hyperplasia.

=== Imaging ===
Lesions of the nipple and areola, such as nipple adenoma, may be difficult to image clearly on routine mammogram or ultrasonography. Nipple adenomas can be imaged using magnetic resonance imaging (MRI) and conventional or MR ductogram.

=== Biopsy ===
Once excised, the macroscopic appearance of nipple adenomas is of a poorly defined nodular mass. The microscopic appearance can be quite bizarre, and may be misinterpreted as a carcinoma. Nipple adenomas usually have a rounded outline at low magnification, and at higher magnification can be seen to consist of a haphazardly arranged mass of proliferating tubular structures composed of epithelial and myoepithelial cells within varying amounts of fibrous stroma. The epithelial cells are usually columnar, but the columnar epithelial cells can undergo apocrine or squamous metaplasia. Mitotic figures and necrosis are not commonly seen.

== Treatment ==
The appropriate treatment in contemporary western medicine is complete surgical excision of the abnormal growth with a small amount of normal surrounding breast tissue.

== Prognosis ==
Nipple adenomas are non-cancerous growths, which can recur if not completely surgically removed. There are reported cases of cancers arising within nipple adenomas, and following excision of nipple adenomas, but these are rare occurrences.

== Epidemiology ==
Nipple adenomas most commonly occur in 30- to 40-year-old women, but can also occur in men. They can also occur at any age, including in the elderly, in adolescence, and in infants.
