= Male breast cancer =

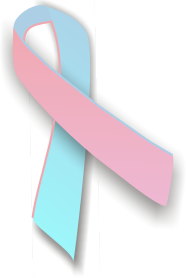
- The pink and blue ribbon is used to signal awareness of male breast cancer.
- Specialty: Oncology

Male breast cancer (MBC) is a cancer in males that originates in their breasts. Males account for less than 1% of new breast cancers with about 20,000 new cases being diagnosed worldwide every year. Its incidence rates in males vs. females are, respectively, 0.4 and 66.7 per 100,000 person-years (person-years is the number of new cases divided by the product of the relevant population's size multiplied by the average number of years of observation, i.e. new cases ÷ [population × years]). The worldwide incidences of male as well as female breast cancers have been increasing since the late 20th century. As of 2018, one of every 800 men were estimated to develop this cancer during their lifetimes.

Because it has a far lower incidence in males and because large-scale breast cancer studies have routinely excluded males, current knowledge of male breast cancer is far less than female breast cancer and often rests on small, retrospective, single-center studies. Consequently, the majority of strategies for evaluating and treating MBC have been adopted from those used for female breast cancer. However, MBC appears to have some features that warrant clinical approaches differing from those for female breast cancer. Features of male breast cancers that differ from those in females include variations in their presentations, associations with other diseases, associations with non-medical predisposing conditions, expressions of key breast cancer-related hormones, causes (including frequency and forms of genetic alterations), tumor types, and treatments.

== Presentation, diagnosis and treatment of breast cancer in males ==
The handling of MBC has typically followed many of the same protocols established for female breast cancer. Female breast cancer most often presents as a mass found on routine screening mammography or self-examination. It may have attracted attention by its size, tenderness, painfulness, or, less commonly, nipple discharge (which may be bloody), nipple retraction, breast swelling, or appearance of a skin lesion such as an ulcer.

The physical examination of these individuals focuses on measuring the size of their lumps and checking other sites, particularly the lymph nodes in the armpit nearest the tumor, for enlargements or masses that may indicate the tumor has metastasized. At this time or later, depending on further findings such as results of a biopsy, the women may be evaluated by medical imaging techniques such as ultrasonography, mammography, CT scans, magnetic resonance imaging, positron-emission tomography, scintimammography, and/or single-photon emission computed tomography to determine the extent of the primary tumor and presence of nearby lymph node and/or distant tissue lesions that may be metastases.

Before or after these initial studies, tissues from the lump are obtained by needle biopsy (sampling with a surgical needle), incisional biopsy (surgical sampling of a part of the tumor), or excisional biopsy (surgical removal of the entire tumor). The recovered tissue is examined for its microscopic histopathology and presence of tumor cells that express the estrogen receptor, progesterone receptor, and HER2/neu receptor. The tumor may also be examined for cells that express the androgen receptor and various gene mutations or other types of gene alterations that are known to be associated with and may contributor to the development and/or progression of breast cancer. Biopsy of the sentinel lymph node (i.e. armpit lymph node closest to the tumor) or multiple other lymph nodes located in this armpit as well as any suspicious and accessible lesion may also be taken. (Sentinel lymph node biopsy is preferred over broad dissection of the armpit lymph nodes for detecting local lymph node metastases.)

Based on the findings of these examinations, the tumor, if considered cancerous, is further defined based on its: a) clinical stage typically using the TNM staging system (i.e. scoring (T)umor size, (N)umber of armpit lymph nodes near the primary tumor with metastases, and (M)etastases in distant tissues); b) grade using the Nottingham system (grades 1, 2, and 3 indicate the tumor cells look progressively less like, and therefore are potentially more aggressive than, the normal tissue cells from which they arose); and c) histopathology (i.e. either in situ or invasive, i.e. cancer cells confined to their tissue of origin or invading adjacent tissue(s), respectively). The histopathology of these tumor is also critical for classifying the breast cancer's type. Depending on their cancers' severity predicted by these analyses, female breast cancer patients are treated with surgical removal, radiotherapy, chemotherapy, hormonal therapy, and/or immunotherapy (i.e. drugs activating or suppressing an individual's immune system).

== Differences between MBC and female breast cancer ==
The following lists medically important breast cancer features that differ between males and females:

=== Presentation ===
Due to men's smaller breast sizes, their breast tumors may become palpable and cause symptoms earlier than those in females. Nonetheless, males tend to lack awareness of breast cancer, may have gynecomastia masking their breast tumors, and may delay seeking medical attention. These differences appear to underlie findings that the diagnosis of breast cancer is made later in males than females (average age 67 vs. 63 years old, respectively).

Studies have reported that males more often than females present with breast cancers that have spread to nearby axillary lymph nodes and appear more aggressive based on their microscopic histopathology. However, a large study by the Surveillance, Epidemiology, and End Results program of the National Institutes of Health ranked breast cancer severity based on their TNM stage. The study reported that the percentage of cases presenting with purely local disease (i.e. no metastases) was 63.1% in males and 45.4% in females; with spread to local lymph nodes was 29.1% in males and 43.6% in females; and with distant metastases was 5.7% in males and 8.1% in females (2.1% of males and 2.9% of females were not staged).

=== Development of contralateral breast cancers ===
Men with breast cancer have an absolute risk of presenting with a second cancer in their other breast of 1.75, i.e. they have a 75% increase of developing a contralateral breast cancer over their lifetimes compared to men who develop a breast cancer without having had a prior breast cancer. Female breast cancer is likewise associated with the development of contralateral breast cancer, with one large study finding the five-year cumulative incidence of developing a contralateral breast cancer of 2.5%. The relative risk of developing a contralateral breast cancer following mastectomy of the involved breast in men versus the probability of developing breast cancer in men without a history of breast cancer is significantly higher than the relative risk in women.

In order to prevent cancer from developing later in their contralateral breasts, women have had prophylactic mastectomy of their uninvolved breasts at the time of their diseased breast's mastectomy. However, increasing evidence in some studies suggest prophylactic mastectomy provides no survival advantage and is associated with increased costs and higher complication rates. The rates of female vs. male contralateral breast cancer and the value of prophylactic mastectomy of the uninvolved breast in males, perhaps because of their rarity compared to females, is unclear. However, breast cancers associated with BRCA1 or BRCA2 gene mutations (see below section on "Gene mutations") are widely considered to be the strongest indication for contralateral prophylactic mastectomy in both male and female breast cancers.

=== Risk factors ===
Radiation exposure to the chest or entire body is clearly associated with increased rates of MBC. For example, men treated with radiotherapy to the chest for thymus gland enlargement or gynecomastia have an increased rate of later developing breast cancer; men and women treated with radiotherapy for breast cancers have increased rates of developing contralateral breast cancer; and male and female survivors of the atomic bomb attacks in Japan (1945) had increased rates of developing breast cancer in proportion to their increasing levels of radiation exposure.

Men with a history of high alcohol consumption and men with occupations entailing long-term exposure to high temperatures (e.g. such as to blast furnaces, steel works, and rolling mills, i.e. mills processing metals), petrol emissions, or exhaust emissions have had, in some studies, increased risks of developing breast cancer. High alcohol consumption is also a risk factor for breast cancer in females.

Studies have reported 1) lower rates of breast cancer (i.e. by 20-25%) in men with an employment history involving high levels of physical activity and 2) higher rates of breast cancer in men with an employment history involving low levels of physical activity. Changes in the fat tissue microenvironment in the male breast as a result of physical activity may contribute to these differences. The level of physical activity has similar effects on the development of female physical activity. However, most studies show that the protective effect in female breast cancer is a 13% decreased risk in high versus low physical activity groups and is limited to postmenopausal women. It is not clear that the higher benefit of physical activity in MBC (20 to 25%) is significantly greater than the 12% benefit seen in female breast cancer.

=== Expression of key receptors ===
The estrogen (ER), progesterone (PR), androgen (AR), and HER2/neu receptors are expressed by breast cancer cells and when active elicit various potentially pro-cancerous responses (e.g. excessive growth) in their parent cells. ER, PR, and AR are activated by estrogens, progesterone, and androgens, respectively, while the HER2/neu receptor has no known hormone-like activators but is active when attached to other members of the ErbB family within the same cell, when overproduced, or when containing certain mutations. The percentage of cases in which breast cancer cells express an ER is 99% of males and 77% of females, the PR is 82% of males and 64% of females, an AR is 97% of males and 77% of females; and the HER2/neu is 9% of males and 11% of females. About 0.3% of males and 11% of females have triple-negative breast cancer, i.e. do not have breast cancer cells that express ER, PR, and HER2/neu receptors and consequently are not amenable to treatment with inhibitors of these receptors. On the other hand, the extremely high rate of estrogen receptor expression in MBC has led to commonly treating these men with a selective estrogen receptor modulator, tamoxifen. Tamoxifen acts indirectly to inhibit ER signaling in breast cancer cells.

=== Associations with other diseases and conditions ===
Klinefelter syndrome is a rare genetic disease in which males have inherited an extra X chromosome. Men with this disease have a 20 to 50-fold increased risk of developing MBC. It is thought that this increased risk is primarily due to their low androgen levels, high gonadotrophins levels, and consequently high estrogen levels relative to androgen levels. Cases of MBC occur in individuals with three other rare inherited genetic disorders, the Li-Fraumeni syndrome, Lynch syndrome, and Cowden syndrome, although the odds ratios (i.e. statistical strength) of these associations is not yet known.

Other states in which males have excessive estrogen relative to androgen levels and increased rates of developing MBC include liver cirrhosis (females with liver cirrhosis do not have an increased incidence of breast cancer), testicular dysfunction (due to, e.g. undescended testes, congenital inguinal hernia, orchitis, i.e. inflammation of the testes caused by, e.g. mumps or testicular malignancies), and consumption of hormonal drugs for, e.g. gender reassignment therapy. (One study reported a 46-fold increased rate of MBC in trans women, i.e. gender reassignment from male to female.) A large study found that diabetes is associated with an increased risk of developing breast cancer with men having a slightly higher but significant risk than women (20.1% of all men vs. 16.5% of all women). In one study of 58 MBC cases, 11 had one or two other malignancies; the malignancies included prostate cancer (4 cases), prostate cancer in a man with Klinefelter's syndrome (1 case), oral cavity cancer plus prostate cancer (1 case)), and melanoma plus colon cancer (1 case).

Earlier studies regarded gynecomastia as a risk factor for MBC, with a pooled analysis finding a 9.78-fold increased risk, meaning the ratio for the odds of development was 9.78 and there was a 95% confidence interval of 7.52 to 12.7. However, more recent studies suggest that there is no established link between gynecomastia and an increased risk of developing MBC.

=== Types of breast cancer ===
Before puberty, male and female mammary tissues consist primarily of ducts connected to poorly developed mammary lobules, i.e. sacs that are connected to the ducts and will produce milk after pregnancy. Following puberty, females but not males have hormone-induced growth in these lobules. Consequently, adult males have far less lobular tissue than adult females and present with breast carcinomas that arise from lobules in ~1% of all cases and ducts in 89% of all cases; these values in women are 8% and 73%, respectively.

The most common histopathology-defined type of MBC is, as it is in females, invasive ductal carcinoma (also termed invasive carcinoma of no special type). The other histopathologically defined types of MBC in descending order of frequency include ductal carcinoma in situ, papillary carcinomas of the breast (occurs in each of its four subtypes, in situ, encapsulated, solid-paapillary, and invasive papillary carcinoma), medullary breast carcinoma, mucinous carcinoma, inflammatory carcinoma, phyllodes tumor, leiomyosarcoma of the breast, Paget's disease of the breast, and invasive lobular carcinoma. Mammary secretory carcinoma and invasive cribriform carcinoma of the breast which in recent studies have accounted for more than 3% and 1.7%, respectively, of MBC cases, can be added to near the top of this list whereas tubular carcinoma of the breast, a subtype of the invasive ductal carcinomas, occurs but is extremely rare in men.

Female breast cancers have a far greater number of types (see breast cancer types) than those reported for men. This may reflect the rarity of many female breast types combined with the rarity of male breast cancer.

=== Gene mutations ===
Two inherited gene mutations critically associated with the development and/or progression of breast cancer occur in the tumor cells of MBC and female breast cancer but with different frequencies: BRCA2 mutations occur in 12% of males and 5% of females while BRCA1 mutations occur in 1% of males and 5-10% of females. These mutations are the two most frequent causes of the hereditary breast–ovarian cancer syndrome, a syndrome associated with increased risks of developing not only breast cancer but also ovary cancer, prostate cancer, and less commonly pancreatic cancer and melanoma. Since men without a history of breast cancer who carry a mutation in a BRCA2 or BRCA1 gene have increased rates of developing prostate cancer, screening for prostate cancer in men with breast cancer who are 45 years or older and carry a BRCA2 gene mutation is strongly recommended and should be considered for men with a BRCA1 gene mutation. The National Comprehensive Cancer Network recommends self-breast examination starting at age 35 for men with mutations in either BRCA gene.

Mutations in other genes such as CHEK2, PALB2, PTEN, ATM and RAD51L3 (also termed RAD51D) have been reported to occur uncommonly in, and may confer an increased risk of developing, MBC. These genes are uncommon causes of the hereditary breast-ovarian syndrome but for the most part are associated with breast but not the other cancers in men. Mutations in the latter genes also occur in female breast cancer and are associated with ovarian as well as breast cancer. The rates of these mutations in male vs. female breast cancer have not been defined.

Breast cancer in the Cowden syndrome is associated with PTEN gene mutations, in the Li-Fraumeni syndrome with tumor protein P53 gene mutations, and in the Lynch syndrome with mutations in any of the four DNA mismatch repair genes (MLH1, MSH2, MSH6, PMS2), or the EpCAM gene.

The relative risks of men vs. women with these inherited syndromes developing breast cancer are unclear.

=== Treatment and prognosis ===
Similar to breast cancer tumors in women, MBC tumors are treated by surgical removal, radiotherapy, chemotherapy, immunotherapy, and/or hormonal therapy. However, there are key differences in these treatments between the two sexes. The most common surgical treatment for MBC tumors has been total mastectomy with breast-conserving surgery being performed in a much smaller proportion of males than females. This difference may be due to men generally having smaller breasts, tumors more often located beneath the areola, tumors more often involving nipples and/or skin, and tumors more often having smaller and narrower resection margins than women. These conditions increase the probability that breast-conserving surgery will leave some tumor cells behind and therefore increase the rate of tumor recurrences. Furthermore, sentinel lymph node biopsies (i.e. biopsies of the armpit lymph node nearest to the tumor) pose challenges because there are anatomical differences in lymph node drainages around the breasts between women and men that can lead to misidentifications of sentinel lymph nodes in men. In spite of these reservations, a recent review of 14,061 MBC cases found no statistically significant difference in the overall survival rates of men treated with mastectomy vs. breast-conserving surgery at 5 years (49.4% vs. 54.7, respectively) and 10 years (19.7 vs. 25.1%, respectively).

The study also found that: a) men treated with adjuvant radiotherapy (i.e. radiotherapy in addition to other treatments) had significantly higher 5 year overall survival rates than men not treated with radiation therapy (59.4% v.s. 44.5%, respectively); b) Tamoxifen therapy improved overall survival rates compared to treatments not using tamoxifen at 5 years (81.7 vs. 71.4, respectively) and 10 years (57.9 vs. 50.4, respectively); c) Tamoxifen therapy improved 5 year overall survival rates compared to therapy with aromatase inhibitors (i.e. medicines that block the production of estrogens); and d) therapy with an aromatase inhibitor plus a GNRH agonist (i.e. medicines that indirectly inhibit production of estrogens, progesterone, and androgens) improved the 5 year overall survival rate over an aromatase inhibitor without a GnRH agonist; Tamoxifen is routinely and very commonly prescribed for treating all stages of MBC. Indeed, studies suggest that the first-line treatment of choice for metastatic male (but not female) breast cancer is tamoxifen with chemotherapy being reserved for MBC cases that are estrogen receptor-negative or become unresponsive to tamoxifen plus highly symptomatic.

Other studies have found that the prognosis of MBC, similar to female breast cancer: depends on their cancer's TNM stage; that stage for stage, the prognoses of MBC appears similar to that in female breast cancer; and that MBC has a somewhat lower 5-year overall survival rate than female breast cancer (82.8% vs. 88.5%, respectively). However, men with breast cancer tend to have additional comorbidities including serious neoplasms and are more likely to die from other causes compared to women with breast cancer. It is suggested that disease-specific survival rate (i.e. percentage of individuals who have not died from breast cancer) would be a more accurate measure of MBC treatment efficacies, prognoses, and survivals than overall survival rates (i.e. the percentage of all individuals who are alive at an indicated time after initial treatment regardless of the cause of death) and should be reported in future studies on MBC.

== Stigma, masculinity, and psychosocial implications ==
Given that male breast cancer is a rare disease that accounts for less than 1% of all breast cancers, the information available on management and support systems was deduced from studies designed for women. The lack of care specific to male patients contributes significantly to the psychosocial burdens they face.

=== Stigma and masculinity ===
A primary psychosocial issue, as mentioned in the narratives of men who have dealt with breast cancer, is the stigma of living with a disease that is commonly associated with femininity. Because breast cancer is most commonly perceived as a "woman's disease," at times men experience a crisis where they feel that their masculinity is being challenged. Some narratives highlight that men may feel that their manhood was "taken away" or that they are "less of a man" due to receiving a breast cancer diagnosis. Stigma and societal pressures like these can lead to avoidant behaviors, causing men to avoid seeking help in a timely manner in fear that it will be seen as an act of weakness, possibly leading to delayed diagnosis.

=== Psychological distress ===
Men with MBC commonly deal with psychological effects, including the following: fear of recurrence, fatigue, and insomnia. Men also deal with the fear of death, which shifts to the fear of recurrence once they reach the survivorship phase.

Survivors of MBC often report concerns about their body image and sexuality. Tamoxifen, a hormonal therapy used to treat MBC patients, is linked to side effects like sexual dysfunction, erectile dysfunction, and loss of libido. Some men have mentioned feeling like menopausal women due to experiencing hot flashes and sweating as side effects. Changes to body appearance post-surgery, like living with mastectomy scars, can also impact body image.

=== Need for tailored support ===
Men often feel excluded or isolated when navigating the healthcare system for breast cancer, given how it is tailored to women. Some examples are how some men have reported feeling awkward when interacting with healthcare staff and how they feel out of place at times when being the only man among women during rehabilitative care.

Although men with MBC often rely mostly on their partner for emotional and social support, they often deal with a lack of support groups that are gender-specific. A lot of men are hesitant to attend mixed-gender support groups out of fear that they would not connect with the experiences that women have, and they prefer not to bother them.
