= Medullary breast carcinoma =

Rare type of breast cancer

Medullary carcinoma of the breast
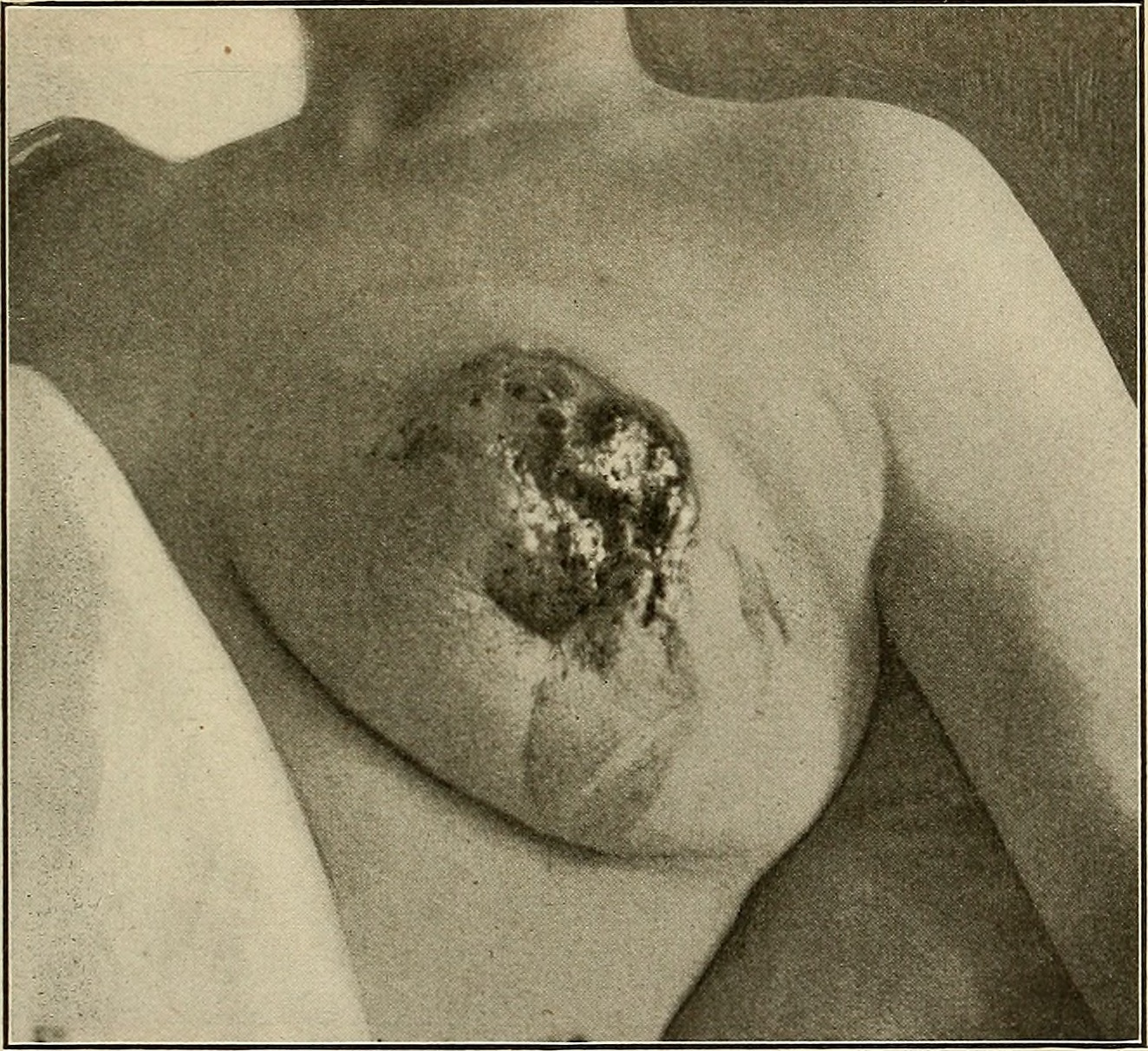
- Specialty: Oncology, pathology

Medullary breast carcinoma is a rare type of breast cancer that is characterized as a relatively circumscribed tumor with pushing, rather than infiltrating, margins. It is histologically characterized as poorly differentiated cells with abundant cytoplasm and pleomorphic high grade vesicular nuclei. It involves lymphocytic (a type of white blood cell) infiltration in and around the tumor and can appear to be brown in appearance with necrosis and hemorrhage. Prognosis is measured through staging but can often be treated successfully and has a better prognosis than other infiltrating breast carcinomas.

Medullary breast carcinoma is one of five types of epithelial breast cancer: ductal, lobular, medullary, colloid, and tubular. Very rare cases of it have been diagnosed in men (see male breast cancer).

Ductal Carcinoma in situ (DCIS) is less commonly present, and medullary breast cancer presents as a soft, fleshy mass with a pushing border. Tumors commonly possess mutations of E-cadherin, which results in its overexpression. Strengthened adhesions between tumor cells reduce the frequency of metastasis.

== Epidemiology ==
It tends to occur more often in younger women and is more frequently found in those with BRCA1 gene mutations. Although this breast carcinoma is more frequently found in BRCA 1 gene mutations, most individuals with BRCA 1 gene mutations do not have medullary breast carcinoma. Medullary breast carcinoma is rare and can be seen in about less than 5% of invasive breast cancers. Due to the complicated nature of classification, there are difficulties in subtyping this type of breast cancer.

== Diagnosis ==
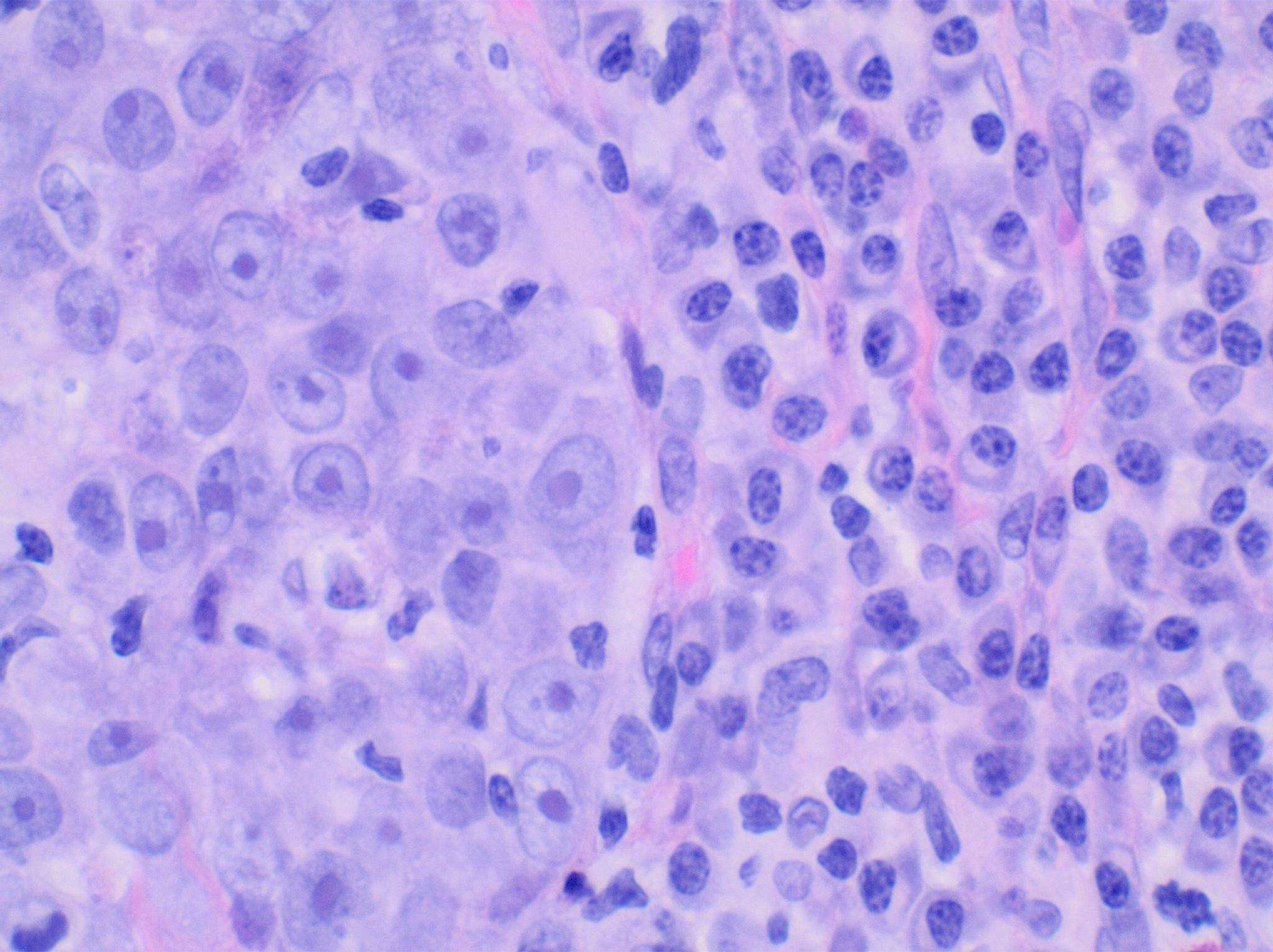
On histopathology, medullary breast carcinoma is characterized by groups of tumor cells with syncytial appearance (that is, seemingly fused cytoplasms, at left). There is typically also a lymphocytic and plasma cell infiltrate (right).

Criteria must be met through the Ridolfi criteria. Although there are other classifications for diagnosis, the Ridolfi criteria are the most commonly used. There must be histologic evidence of lymphoplasmacytic infiltration, noninvasive microscopic circumscription, greater than 75% syncytial growth pattern, and high-grade nuclei. It is immunologically typically triple-negative, with negative estrogen receptors (ER), negative progesterone receptors (PR), and negative HER2/neu receptors. There are also medullary breast carcinomas that are found to be estrogen receptors (ER) and/or progesterone receptor (PR) positive, making diagnosis less straightforward.

	Ridolfi Criteria
1.	Lymphoplasmacytic infiltration
2.	Noninvasive microscopic circumscription
3.	>75% syncytial growth pattern
4.	High-grade nuclei

== Staging ==
TNM Staging is used to determine the extent of the disease and is used to guide the management and treatment of the cancer. It can be divided into Primary Tumor (T), Lymph Nodes (N), and Metastasis (M). The American Joint Committee on Cancer (AJCC) revised the staging system in 2018 to include the anatomic extent of the disease as well as prognostic biomarkers.

	Primary Tumor (T)
T0	No primary tumor
Tis	Carcinoma in situ
T1	Tumor is ≤2 cm
T2	Tumor is >2 cm but ≤5 cm
T3	Tumor is >5 cm
T4	Tumor extends to chest wall or skin

	Lymph Nodes (N)
N0	No lymph node metastasis
N1	Metastasis to 1-3 axillary lymph nodes
N2	Metastasis to 4-9 axillary lymph nodes
N3	Metastasis to ≥10 axillary lymph nodes

	Metastasis (M)
M0	No metastasis
M1	Metastasis

=== Prognostic biomarkers ===
- Estrogen receptor (ER), Progesterone receptor (PR), and HER2 receptor expression
- Histologic grade: Determined through the characteristics and features of tumor
- Recurrence score: Score <11 shows better prognosis

== Management and treatment ==
=== Imaging ===
If breast cancer is suspected, imaging should be obtained through ultrasound, mammography, and/or MRI with appropriate biopsies.

=== Immunohistochemical testing ===
Immunological and histological testing should also be obtained for receptor status, which influences the type of treatment required. Since medullary breast carcinoma typically presents as triple negative, it may be treated with a more intensive chemotherapy regimen as with other triple negative breast cancers. This cancer has been found to respond well to chemotherapy compared to other breast cancers. Despite this, some cases of medullary breast carcinoma do not require chemotherapy for successful treatment. Depending on immunologic status, endocrine therapy can be utilized as well.

== Prognosis ==
Medullary breast carcinoma has a lower propensity to metastasize compared to other types of breast cancers. Compared to infiltrating ductal carcinomas, medullary breast carcinoma has a better prognosis and a significantly higher survival rate. The best measure of prognosis is through staging and axillary lymph node involvement in the absence of metastatic disease. The higher the involvement of lymph nodes, the worse the prognosis. There is also an association between higher survival rates and chemotherapy response with the presence of lymphocytic infiltration.

== See also ==
Male breast cancer
