= MammaPrint =

Test for early stage breast cancer

MammaPrint is a prognostic and predictive diagnostic test for early stage breast cancer patients that assess the risk that a tumor will metastasize to other parts of the body. It gives a binary result, high-risk or low-risk classification, and helps physicians determine whether or not a patient will benefit from chemotherapy. Women with a low risk result can safely forego chemotherapy without decreasing likelihood of disease free survival. MammaPrint is part of the personalized medicine portfolio marketed by Agendia.

MammaPrint is based on the Amsterdam 70-gene breast cancer gene signature and uses formalin-fixed-paraffin-embedded (FFPE) or fresh tissue for microarray analysis. It is a laboratory developed test (LDT) which falls into the class of In Vitro Diagnostic Multivariate Index Assays (IVDMIA). MammaPrint was the first (2007) IVDMIA to be cleared by the Food and Drug Administration (FDA) in a De Novo Classification Process (Evaluation of Automatic Class III Designation) and is the only molecular diagnostic test with a randomized prospective clinical trial validating clinical utility. The test uses RNA isolated from tumor samples and run on custom glass microarray slides in order to determine the expression of a 70-gene signature. The expression profile is then used in a proprietary algorithm to categorically classify the patient as being at either high or low risk of breast cancer recurrence.

MammaPrint has been prospectively, clinically validated for use in early stage (I and II) breast cancer patients regardless of estrogen receptor (ER) or Human Epidermal Growth Factor Receptor 2 (HER2) status, with a tumor size ≤ 5.0 cm, and 0-3 positive lymph nodes (LN0-1), with no special specifications for N1mi pathology. This differentiates MammaPrint from other multi-gene assays in use today that have only shown predictive value in ER positive, HER2 negative, lymph node (LN) negative patients. MammaPrint is also indicated for patients with ER negative tumors (15% of tumors). There are no exclusion criteria based on histopathologic tumor type (i.e. ductal, lobular, mixed, etc.) or age. MammaPrint is predictive for pre- and post-menopausal women.

== Development ==
The Human Genome Project identified approximately 25,000 genes in the human genome and created the possibility for personalized medicine. The Netherlands Cancer Institute (NKI) in Amsterdam utilized this information and applied it specifically to breast cancer, creating the Amsterdam 70-gene signature (70-GS). MammaPrint is the commercialized assay that measures the 70-GS.

The NKI hypothesized that breast cancer is a genetic, heterogeneous disease, where gene expression would be different in aggressive breast tumors that develop recurrences following surgery than from those that are less aggressive and do not recur or spread throughout the body. To identify a novel and independent predictor of breast cancer recurrence, DNA microarray technology was used to interrogate all 25,000 genes in untreated tumor samples from women where follow-up categorized them as being disease free or having distant metastases within five years. Supervised classification identified significantly different expression patterns in 70 genes that were strongly predictive of a short interval to distant metastases.

=== Implications for utility ===
The paradigm used to development the 70-GS makes it unique in molecular breast cancer diagnostics because it allowed the tumor biology itself to show the genes most predictive of known patient outcomes. Rather than pre-selecting a few genes based on literature and known information at a given time, supervised learning from the entire expressed genome gives it farsighted utility as the knowledge of cancer biology evolves. Furthermore, development using untreated tumors allows physicians to know their patient's risk of recurrence, without any treatment bias or assumptions, before making a patient's treatment plan.

== Clinical Utility ==
Molecular diagnostics are used in combination with traditional clinicopathologic factors to decide on a treatment plan. MammaPrint provides a binary result, either high risk or low risk. Patients with a low risk result are unlikely to develop distant metastases and are therefore unlikely to benefit from chemotherapy. Since many breast cancers are considered genomically low-risk independent from clinicopathology, a significant number of patients can be saved from overtreatment with chemotherapy.

=== Guideline Inclusion ===
MammaPrint is included as standard of care with the highest medical level of evidence in the following guidelines

- Dutch Institute CBO Guidelines for treatment of primary breast cancer
- St. Gallen's International Oncology Guidelines for the treatment of early stage breast cancer
- German Gynecological Oncology Group (AGO) guidelines for breast cancer management
- European Group on Tumour Markers (EGTM)

== Ordering indications ==
In February 2007, the U.S. Food and Drug Administration (FDA) cleared the MammaPrint test for use in the U.S. for lymph node negative breast cancer patients of all ages, ER negative or ER positive, with tumors of less than 5 cm. MammaPrint can be considered as a part of standard of care disease management for early stage breast cancer and has significant insurance coverage in the US, including coverage through Medicare and Medicaid. The American Medical Association has granted a Category 1, MAAA Current Procedural Terminology (CPT) code for MammaPrint.

Indications for ordering MammaPrint include:

=== USA- ===
- Breast Cancer Stage 1 or Stage 2
- Invasive carcinoma (infiltrating carcinoma)
- Tumor size <5.0 cm
- Lymph node negative
- Estrogen receptor positive (ER+) or Estrogen receptor negative (ER-)
- Women of all ages

Samples from the United States and North America are processed and run in CLIA certified lab in Irvine, CA.

=== International- ===
- Breast Cancer Stage 1 or Stage 2
- Invasive carcinoma (infiltrating carcinoma)
- Tumor size <5.0 cm
- Lymph node status: negative or positive (up to 3 nodes)
- ER+ or ER-

Samples from outside North America are processed and run in Amsterdam, Netherlands.

=== Pakistan- ===
Mammaprint is now exclusively available in Pakistan through Precision Diagnostic Laboratory

=== Tissue sampling technique ===
Tumor samples may be submitted as core needle biopsies or surgical specimen. MammaPrint is FDA cleared to accept fresh, frozen, and formalin fixed paraffin embedded (FFPE) specimen types. There are two specimen types that can be submitted:

- Formalin-fixed paraffin-embedded tissue block or 10 unstained slides with a 5 micron section on each slide. Quality measures require invasive tumor cellularity of ≥30%.

or

- Fresh specimens are currently accepted for research purposes. Samples must be at least 3x3mm (tic-tac size) preserved in RNARetain®. Maximum side dimension should not exceed 5 mm to allow adequate penetration of RNARetain. Invasive tumor cellularity of ≥30% is required.

== Cost and Cost-Effectiveness ==
The cost of the assay in the U.S. is $4,200. In Europe, the test costs EUR 2675.

Several studies show that the use of the MammaPrint is cost-effective for patients in the United States, Europe, Canada and Japan by providing additional information to help doctors tailor treatment to the individual patient.

MammaPrint provides definitive results and does not have an intermediate category, making it more cost-effective than other breast cancer risk assays available.

== Key Clinical trials ==
MammaPrint is the only commercially available breast cancer molecular diagnostic assay to achieve level 1A evidence. Other extensive clinical trials and research collaborations have produced numerous retrospective and prospective validation studies over the past decade which have enabled the successful commercialization of genomic microarray assays, such as the FDA-cleared 70-gene MammaPrint profile. Large, multi-institutional clinical trials, such as MINDACT and ISPY-2, are assessing MammaPrint.

=== MINDACT ===
The MINDACT trial provides the highest medical level of evidence, level 1A, for the use of MammaPrint in early stage breast cancer. The MINDACT (Microarray In Node negative and 1-3 positive lymph node Disease may Avoid Chemotherapy) clinical trial is a multi-center, prospective, phase III randomized study comparing the MammaPrint 70-gene expression signature with a common clinical-pathological prognostic tool (Adjuvant! Online) in selecting patients with negative or 1-3 positive nodes for adjuvant chemotherapy in breast cancer.

Publication in the New England Journal of Medicine showed 6,693 breast cancer patients enrolled from 112 participating institutions in 9 European Countries.

In the MINDACT trial, women with breast cancer who are assessed as “High Risk” by both MammaPrint and clinical-pathologic guidelines are advised to have chemotherapy whereas for women with “Low Risk” concordance, hormonal therapy alone is recommended. However, discordant cases are randomized to receive either chemotherapy or hormonal therapy based on clinical-pathological risk assessment or MammaPrint and the patients are followed. The results of MINDACT validate MammaPrint as an important prognostic and predictive tool in cancer treatment.

Primary findings of the MINDACT trial are:

- 46% of patients identified as high risk for recurrence according to clinical-pathological factors as described in the publication, and who therefore would be usual candidates for adjuvant chemotherapy, were reclassified as Low Risk by MammaPrint and MINDACT shows could safely forgo chemotherapy.
- MammaPrint can change clinical practice by providing critical prognostic information to aid in assessing patients’ risk for distant metastasis and potentially sparing over one hundred thousand women annually with early-stage breast cancer worldwide from unnecessary toxicities and side effects from chemotherapy and creating considerable cost savingsr.
- As demonstrated in the MINDACT trial, MammaPrint is now the only FDA-cleared breast cancer prognostic test with the highest level of evidence (1A) for its clinical utility to aid correctly identifying Low Risk patients

=== PROMIS ===
Prospective Registry Of MammaPrint in breast cancer patients with an Intermediate recurrence Score (PROMIS). This will be a prospective observational, case-only, study of MammaPrint in patients with an Oncotype DX intermediate score (18-30). The clinical data is to be entered online. There will be two Case Report Forms (CRF). The first CRF must be completed before receiving the MammaPrint result. This CRF will capture baseline patient characteristics, pathology information, Oncotype DX score and the recommended treatment plan without knowing the MammaPrint result. The second CRF will be completed within 4 weeks after receiving the MammaPrint result and will capture the recommended treatment based on MammaPrint. It is expected that approximately 20-30 institutions in the US will participate. Around 300 patients will be enrolled in 2 years.

This study has the following objectives:

- Describe the frequency of chemotherapy + endocrine versus endocrine alone decisions in Oncotype DX intermediate score patients
- Assess the impact of MammaPrint on chemotherapy + endocrine versus endocrine alone treatment decisions
- Assess the distribution of MammaPrint Low and High Risk in patients with an intermediate recurrence score
- Assess concordance of TargetPrint ER, PR and Her2 results with Oncotype DX ER, PR and Her2 and with locally assessed IHC/FISH ER, PR and Her2
- Compare clinical subtype based on IHC/FISH ER, PR, Her2 and Ki-67 (if available) with BluePrint molecular subtype

=== I-SPY I and I-SPY II ===
(CALGB 150007/150012 & ACRIN 6657)

Agendia's MammaPrint signature and its microarray technology are integral components of biomarker analysis and molecular prediction in the landmark National Cancer Institute supported I-SPY I and II I-SPY II breast cancer clinical trials which focus on the prediction of therapeutic response in the neoadjuvant setting. The utilization of MammaPrint and Agendia's whole-genome, microarray platform are anticipated to assist in rapid, focused development of oncologic therapies paired with biomarkers.

Key Objectives of I-SPY breast cancer trials for which the MammaPrint whole-genome microarray is utilized:

- I-SPY I evaluated biomarkers and imaging for predicting response to standard neoadjuvant chemotherapy
- I-SPY II will evaluate Phase 2 drugs in combination with standard chemotherapy in a neoadjuvant setting
- I-SPY II will use biomarkers to stratify patients based on their predicted likelihood of response to treatment

=== MINT ===
Multi Institutional Neo Adjuvant Therapy Mammaprint Project (MINT). Patients with locally advanced breast cancer (LABC) are often treated with neoadjuvant chemotherapy to shrink the tumor before definitive surgery is performed. This allows oncologists to measure a patient's response to a given chemotherapy regimen in vivo. Achievement of a complete pathologic response (pCR) to neoadjuvant chemotherapy allows for a better prediction of the prospect for a favorable outcome.

Genomics assays that measure specific gene expression patterns in a patient's primary tumor have become important prognostic tools for breast cancer patients. This study is designed to test the ability of MammaPrint® in combination with TargetPrint®, BluePrint®, and TheraPrint®, as well as traditional pathologic and clinical prognostic factors, to predict responsiveness to neo-adjuvant chemotherapy in patients with LABC.

This study has the following objectives:

- To determine the predictive power of chemosensitivity of the combination of MammaPrint and BluePrint as measured by pCR.
- To compare TargetPrint single gene read out of ER, PR and HER2 with local and centralized IHC and/or CISH/FISH assessment of ER, PR and HER2.
- To identify possible correlations between the TheraPrint Research Gene Panel outcomes and chemoresponsiveness.
- To identify and/or validate predictive gene expression profiles of clinical response/resistance to chemotherapy.
- To compare the three BluePrint molecular subtype categories with IHC-based subtype classification.

=== NBRST ===
Prospective neo-adjuvant REGISTRY trial linking MammaPrint, Subtyping and treatment response: Neoadjuvant Breast Registry - Symphony™ Trial (NBRST) (pronounced “in breast”.) This is a prospective observational, case-only, study linking MammaPrint, BluePrint, TargetPrint, TheraPrint and possible additional profiles of interest to treatment response, Recurrence Free Survival (RFS) and Distant Metastases Free Survival (DMFS). Only patients who receive neo-adjuvant therapy can participate. For this project, approximately 20-30 institutions in the US will be invited to contribute clinical patient data from enrolled patients after a MammaPrint, TargetPrint, BluePrint and TheraPrint test has been successfully performed and the patient has started neo-adjuvant therapy. Treatment is at the discretion of the physician, adhering to NCCN approved regimens or a recognized alternative.

The clinical data is to be entered online at 4 time points; amounting to four Case Report Forms (CRFs). Data will be collected on an ongoing basis, the first CRF must be completed within 6 weeks after the MammaPrint, BluePrint, TargetPrint, and TheraPrint result was provided. The second CRF should be completed by 4 weeks after definitive surgery. CRF 3 and CRF4 will be completed 2-3 and 5 years after surgery. It is expected that we will enroll around 500 patients in 4 years.

This registry study has the following objectives:

- Measure chemosensitivity (as defined by pCR) or endocrine sensitivity (as defined by decrease in longest tumor diameter or RCB1) in the molecular subgroups as determined by combining MammaPrint and BluePrint results.
- Correlate chemosensitivity (as defined by pCR) to TheraPrint Therapy Gene Assay results.
- Compare local IHC and FISH results (if available) with TargetPrint results.
- Compare the three BluePrint molecular subgroups with IHC-based subtype classification.
- Document impact of MammaPrint, TargetPrint and BluePrint result on treatment decision.
- Assess the 2-3 and 5 years DMFS and RFS for the different molecular subgroups.
- Measure chemosensitivity or endocrine sensitivity correlation with novel expression profiles.

== See also ==
- Breast cancer classification
- Personalized Medicine
- Personal genomics
- Cancer genomics (Oncogenomics)
