= Pseudoangiomatous stromal hyperplasia =

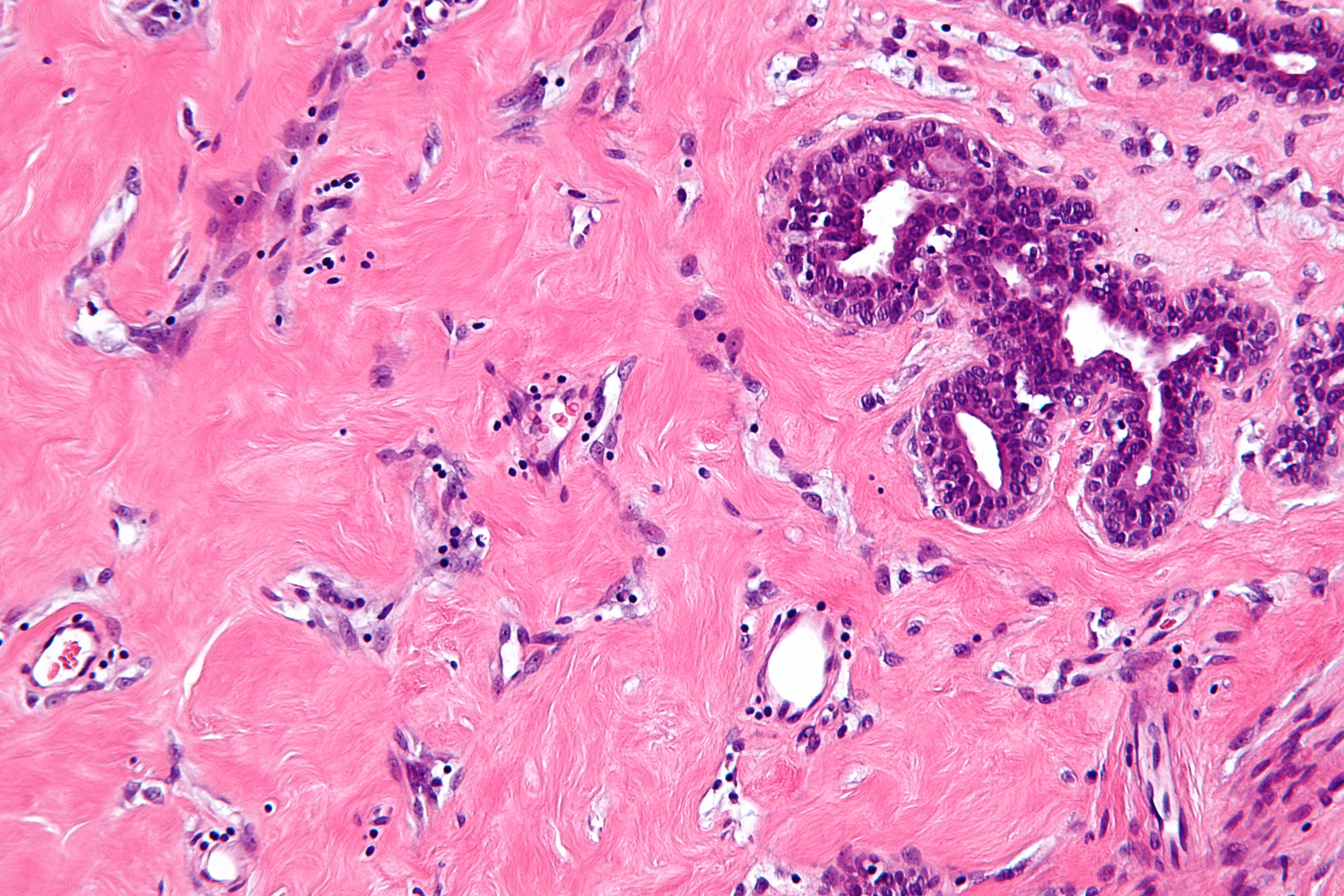
- High magnification micrograph of pseudoangiomatous stromal hyperplasia showing the characteristic small, anastomosing blood vessel-like channels. H&E stain.
- Specialty: Pathology

Pseudoangiomatous stromal hyperplasia (PASH) is an overgrowth of myofibroblastic cells in the breast. It has an appearance similar to fibroadenomatoid changes.

The diagnostic significance is currently uncertain, but it appears to be benign. There have been cases of PASH diagnosed where the tumors co-exist with breast cancer. Other cases have made screening for breast cancer difficult and in some cases impossible due to the number and density of the existing PASH tumors. These cases have resulted in the necessity of a mastectomy and double mastectomy.

== Diagnosis ==
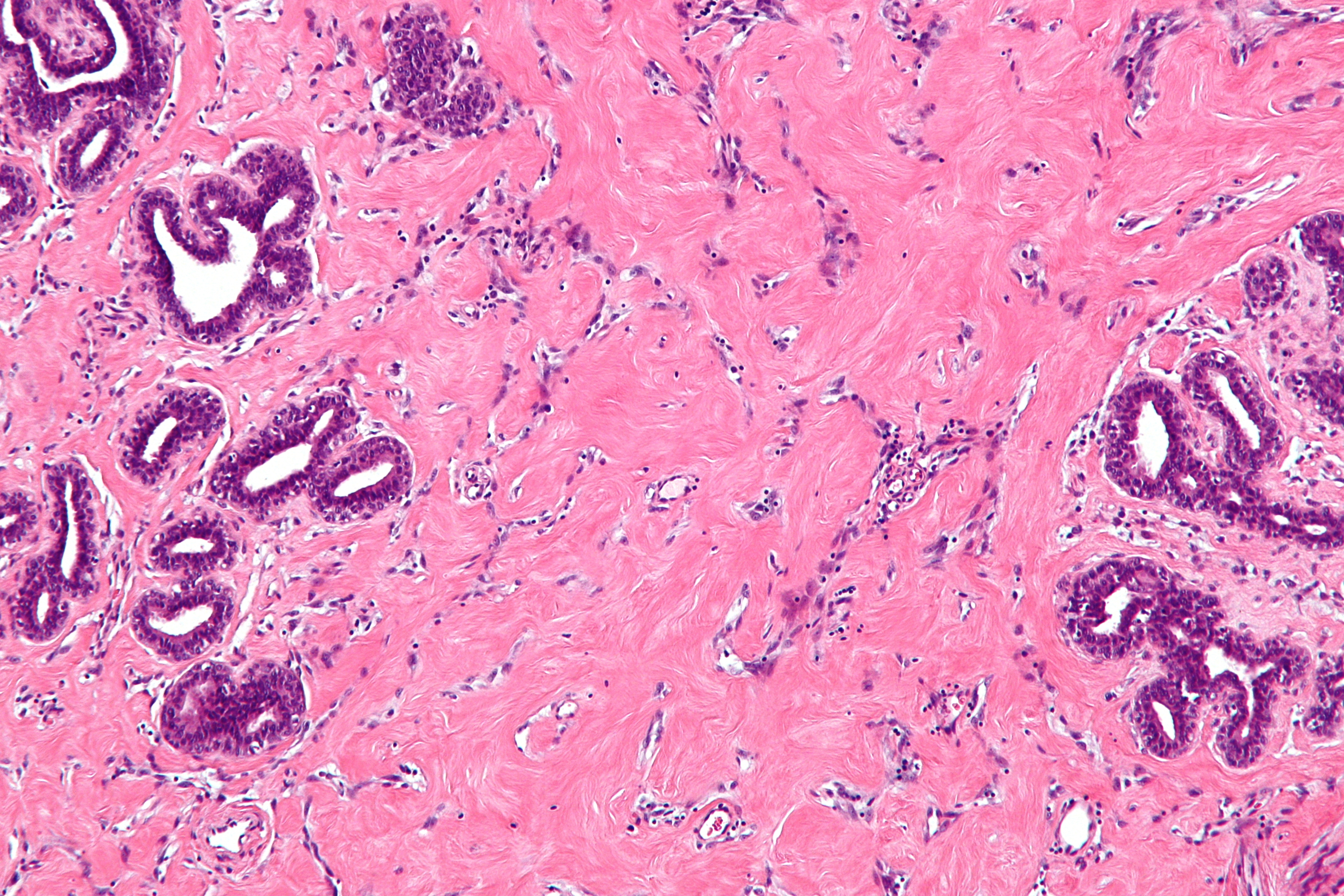
Intermediate magnification micrograph showing the relative abundance of stroma in a case of PASH. H&E stain.

The diagnosis of PASH is by biopsy.

The important differential diagnosis is angiosarcoma, from which it was first differentiated in 1986.

=== Differential diagnosis ===
- Fibroadenoma
- Angiosarcoma

== Treatment ==
The management of PASH is controversial. Excision may be indicated in enlarging masses or lesions with atypical features.
