= HOXB13 =

Protein-coding gene in the species Homo sapiens

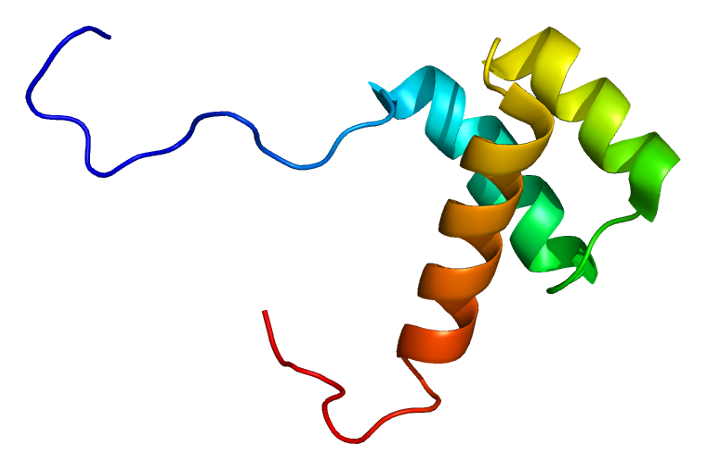

Identifiers
- Aliases: HOXB13, PSGD, homeobox B13, HPC9
- External IDs: OMIM: 604607; MGI: 107730; GeneCards: HOXB13
Available structures
PDB	Ortholog search: PDBe RCSB
PDB	List of PDB id codes 2CRA

Gene location (Human)
Chr.	Chromosome 17 (human)
Band	17q21.32	Start	48,724,763 bp
Band	17q21.32	End	48,728,750 bp
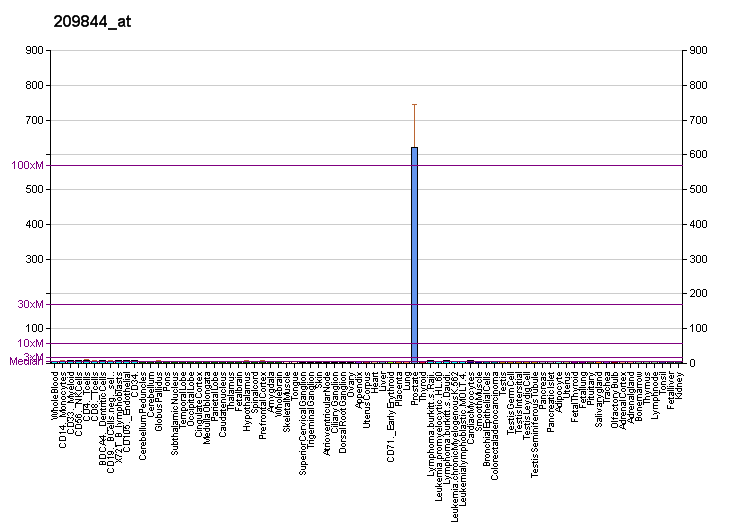
RNA expression pattern
Bgee	Human / Mouse (ortholog); Top expressed in: rectum; mucosa of sigmoid colon; prostate; mucosa of transverse colon; gonad; vagina; epithelium of colon; muscle layer of sigmoid colon; urinary bladder; muscle tissue / n/a; More reference expression data
BioGPS	More reference expression data
Gene ontology
Molecular function	DNA binding; DNA-binding transcription repressor activity, RNA polymerase II-specific; sequence-specific DNA binding; DNA-binding transcription factor activity, RNA polymerase II-specific; methyl-CpG binding
Cellular component	nucleus; transcription regulator complex; nucleoplasm
Biological process	response to testosterone; morphogenesis of an epithelium; multicellular organism development; regulation of growth; regulation of transcription, DNA-templated; response to wounding; prostate epithelial cord arborization involved in prostate glandular acinus morphogenesis; angiogenesis; transcription, DNA-templated; epithelial cell maturation involved in prostate gland development; epidermis development; prostate gland development; negative regulation of transcription by RNA polymerase II
Sources:Amigo / QuickGO
Orthologs
Databases	NCBI: entry; OMA: entry
Species	Human	Mouse
Entrez	10481	15408
Ensembl	ENSG00000159184	ENSMUSG00000049604
UniProt	Q92826	P70321
RefSeq (mRNA)	NM_006361	NM_008267
RefSeq (protein)	NP_006352	NP_032293
Location (UCSC)	Chr 17: 48.72 – 48.73 Mb	n/a
PubMed search
- Wikidata
View/Edit Human	View/Edit Mouse

Homeobox protein Hox-B13 is a protein that in humans is encoded by the HOXB13 gene.

== Function ==
This gene encodes a transcription factor that belongs to the homeobox gene family. Genes of this family are highly conserved among vertebrates and essential for vertebrate embryonic development. This gene has been implicated in fetal skin development and cutaneous regeneration. In mice, a similar gene was shown to exhibit temporal and spatial colinearity in the main body axis of the embryo, but was not expressed in the secondary axes, which suggests functions in body patterning along the axis. This gene and other HOXB genes form a gene cluster on chromosome 17 in the 17q21.32 region. Men who inherit a rare (<0.1% in a selected group of patients without clinical signs of prostate cancer) genetic variant in HOXB13 (G84E or rs138213197) have a 10-20-fold increased risk of prostate cancer.

== See also ==
- Homeobox
