= Paget's disease of the breast =

- Other names: Paget disease of the breast, Paget's disease of the nipple, Mammary Paget's disease
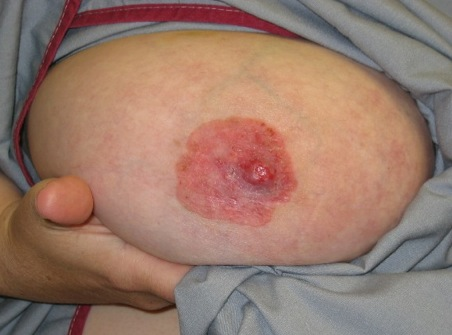
- Paget's disease of the nipple
- Pronunciation: /ˈpædʒət/, rhymes with "gadget"
- Specialty: Gynecologic Oncology
- Named after: James Paget

Paget's disease of the breast (also known as mammary Paget's disease) is a rare skin change at the nipple nearly always associated with underlying breast cancer. Paget's disease of the breast was first described by Sir James Paget in 1874. The condition is an uncommon disease accounting for 1 to 4% of all breast cancer cases. 92% to 100% of patients with Paget's disease of the breast have an underlying breast cancer.

The condition in itself often appears innocuous, limited to a surface appearance and it is sometimes dismissed, although it is actually indicative of underlying breast cancer.

== Signs and symptoms ==
Paget's disease of the breast can affect the nipple and areola: the nipple is typically affected first and then the skin changes spread to the areola. It is common for symptoms to wax and wane. Symptoms typically only affect one breast and may include:

- Skin: The first symptom is usually an eczema-like rash. The skin of the nipple and areola may be red, itchy, or tingly. After a period of time, the skin may become flaky, scaly, or thickened. Many patients do not visit the doctor because they assume Paget's disease of the breast to be minor contact dermatitis or eczema.
- Nipple discharge: A discharge, which may be yellow or bloody, may ooze from the area.
- Nipple changes: The nipple may become inverted.
- Breast changes: Palpable lumps or masses may be present. There may be redness, oozing and crusting, and a sore that does not heal.

A person with Paget's disease of the breast may experience signs and symptoms for several months before a diagnosis is made.

== Pathophysiology ==
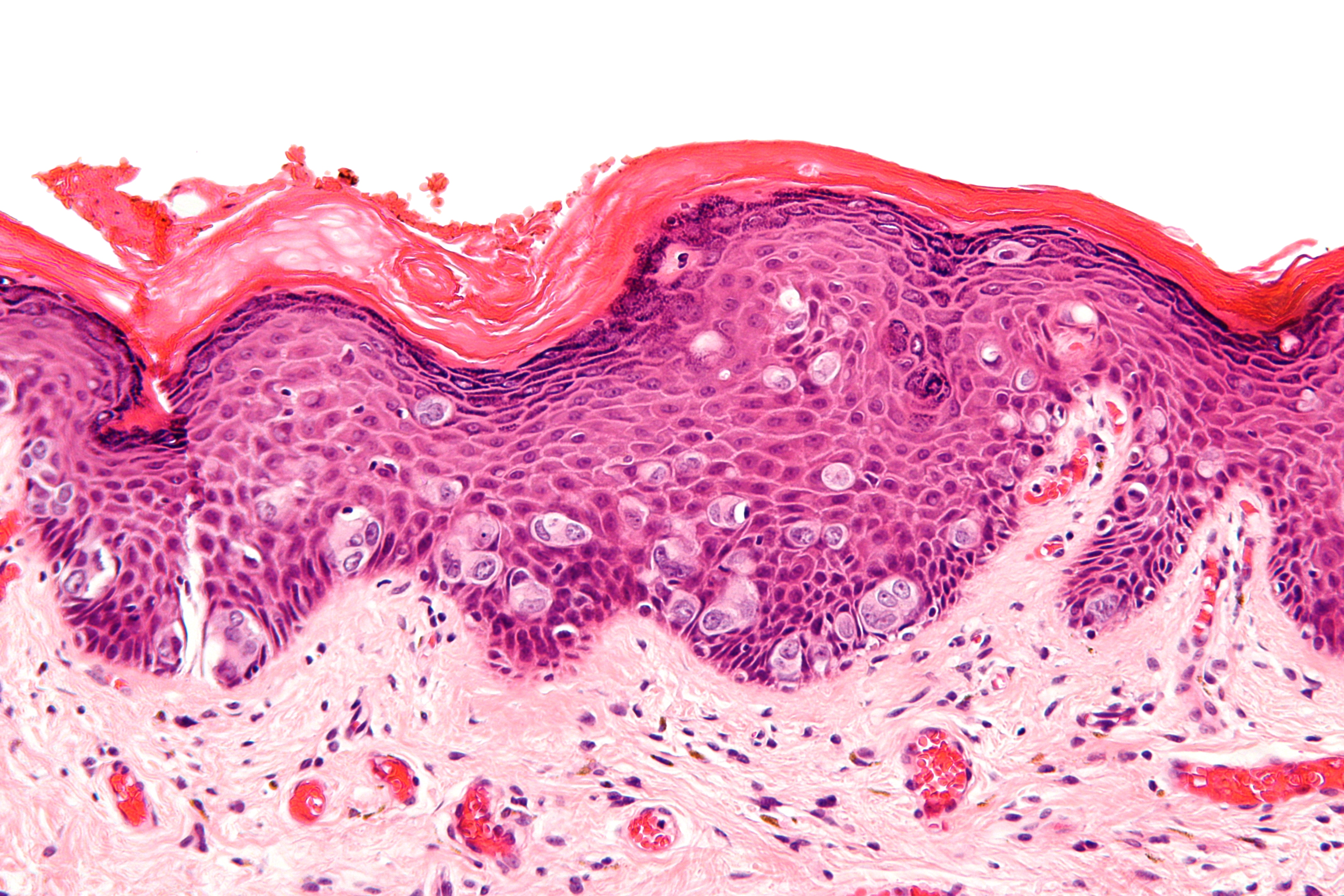
Micrograph of Paget's disease. H&E stain.

Paget's disease of the breast is characterized by Paget cells: large cells with clear cytoplasm (clear halo) and eccentric (not centered), hyperchromic (darkly colored) nuclei found throughout the epidermis.

There is some controversy as to whether these cancer cells travel through the ductal system of the breast to the nipple, or whether these cells result from in situ malignant transformation.

The most widely accepted theory of how Paget's disease of the breast arises is the migratory theory: ductal carcinoma in situ cancerous cells migrate into the lactiferous sinuses and out of the nipple onto the skin. Cancer cells disrupt the normal epithelial barrier and fluid accumulates on the surface of the skin, resulting in the crusting of the skin of the nipple and/ or areola.

== Diagnosis ==
During a physical examination, the provider will likely conduct a breast examination: evaluating the appearance of the skin on and around the nipples, and feeling for any lumps or areas of thickening in the breast and armpit.

Paget's disease of the breast is difficult to diagnose by physical exam alone due to its resemblance to dermatitis and eczema. One helpful differentiator is that eczema tends to affect the areola first, and then the nipple, whereas Paget's disease of the breast typically begins at the nipple and spreads outwards. In addition, nipple eczema is typically responsive to topical steroid application, while Paget's disease of the breast will not improve with topical steroid use.

Mammogram and biopsy with cytopathology are common confirmatory tests. In biopsy, a tissue sample removed from the affected area is then examined under the microscope by a pathologist, who distinguishes Paget cells from other cell types by staining tissues to identify specific cells (immunohistochemistry).

Less commonly, samples of nipple discharge may also be examined under the microscope to determine whether Paget cells are present. In addition, ultrasound of the breast may be performed in the absence of positive findings on mammography.

== Treatment ==
Paget's disease of the breast is a symptom of underlying breast cancer. Treatment is variable and is determined by the type of breast cancer in addition to its staging and prognostic considerations. Management often involves a lumpectomy or mastectomy to surgically remove the tumour. Chemotherapy and/or radiotherapy may also be necessary.

Patients with Paget's disease of the breast that has not spread beyond the nipple are often treated with breast-conserving surgery: removal of the cancerous area of the nipple and areola, but conservation of the rest of the breast. Patients then usually undergo radiation therapy after surgery as an adjuvant treatment to prevent recurrence.

In most cases, adjuvant treatment is part of the treatment schema. Adjuvant therapy is given to patients with cancer as a secondary form of treatment to minimize the risk of recurrence by targeting undetectable metastases. Whether adjuvant therapy is needed depends upon the type of cancer and its staging. In Paget's disease of the breast, the most common type of adjuvant therapy is radiation following breast-conservative surgery as discussed above.

Paget's disease of the breast with underlying breast cancer is primarily treated with mastectomy. In cases of invasive cancer, radical mastectomy is performed: removal of the breast, the lining over the chest muscles, and affected lymph nodes from under the arm. In cases of noninvasive cancers, simple mastectomy are performed in which only the breast with the lining over the chest muscles is removed.

== Prognosis ==
Three factors are evaluated when determining prognosis for breast cancer: whether there is a palpable mass, whether lymph nodes have cancer cells in them, and whether there is an underlying metastatic cancer. Prognosis of Paget's disease of the breast with underlying breast cancer depends on these three factors of the underlying cancer. Whether or not a patient has Paget's disease of the breast does not affect their prognosis in the presence of underlying breast cancer.

Patients with Paget's disease of the breast and no underlying breast cancer have a 5-year relative survival rate of 82.6%.

== Epidemiology ==
Most patients diagnosed with Paget's disease of the breast are over age 50, but rare cases have been diagnosed in patients in their 20s. The average age at diagnosis is 57. The disease is rare among both women and men, but more common in women.

== See also ==
- List of cutaneous conditions
