= Pure apocrine carcinoma of the breast =

- Other names: Pure apocrine carcinoma, Pure invasive apocrine carcinoma
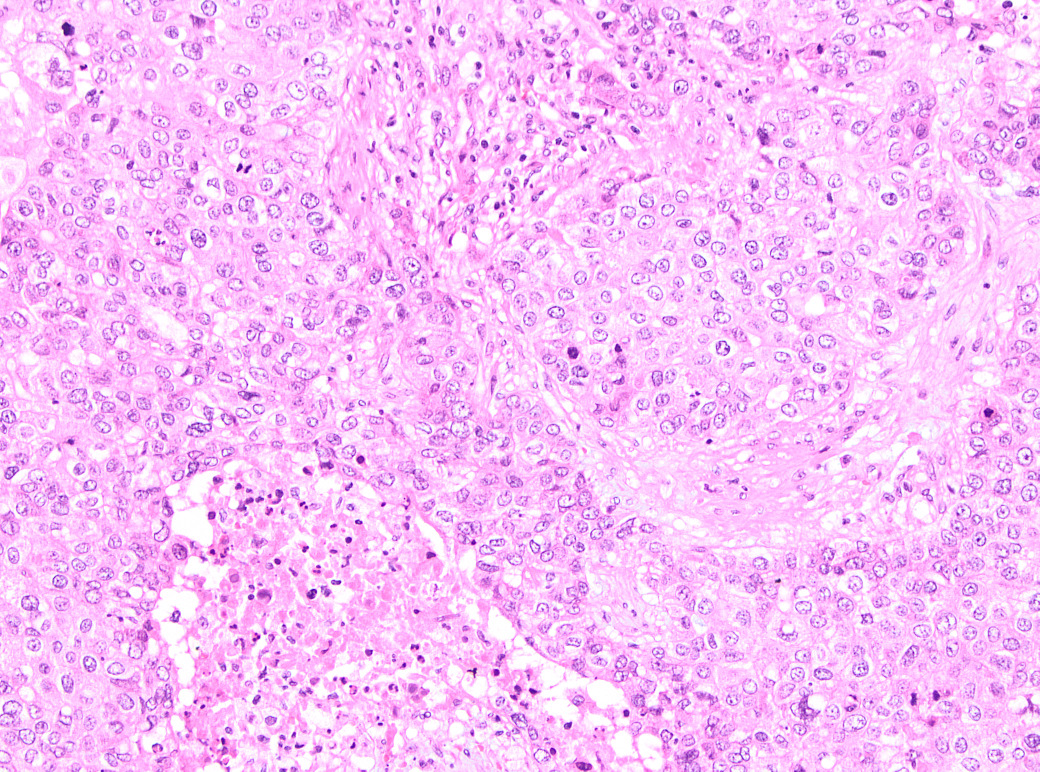
- Fig 1
- Specialty: Oncology, Surgical oncology

Pure apocrine carcinoma of the breast (PACB) is a rare carcinoma derived from the epithelial cells in the lactiferous ducts of the mammary gland. The mammary gland is an apocrine gland. Its lactiferous ducts have two layers of epithelial cells, a luminal layer which faces the duct's lumen (i.e. passageway) and a basal layer which lies beneath the luminal layer. There are at least four subtypes of epithelial cells in these ducts: luminal progenitor cells and luminal mature cells which reside in the luminal layer and mammary stem cells and basal cells which reside in the basal layer. Examination of the genes expressed in PACB cancer cells indicate that most of these tumors consist of cells derived from luminal cells but a minority of these tumors consist of cells derived from basal cells.

Invasive apocrine carcinomas of the breast with an appreciable amount of apocrine gland-like tissue was termed apocrine breast tumors for decades when in 1988 d'Amore et al named a subset of these carcinomas in which >90% of its tissue consisted of apocrine gland-like tissue as pure invasive apocrine carcinoma. In 2010, Vranic and colleagues added further to the definition of PACP to establish the criteria currently used for its diagnosis. They defined it as a carcinoma that: a) has a component(s) which invades adjacent tissue; b) consists of >90% apocrine gland-like tissue; c) has at least 10% of its cancer cells that express androgen receptors; and d) lacks cancer cells that express estrogen receptors and progesterone receptors. Many PACB tumors have cancer cells which overexpress the HER2/neu receptor-like protein. The World Health Organization (2019) did not define any of the other invasive apocrine carcinomas as diagnostically distinct entities, but did recognize invasive ductal breast carcinoma in which >90% of its cancer cells were apocrine gland cells as "carcinoma with apocrine differentiation." Non-invasive apocrine carcinoma of the breast, i.e. apocrine ductal carcinoma in situ, is classified as a variant of ductal carcinoma in situ breast tumors. Invasive carcinomas consisting of 10%–90% apocrine tumor tissue have been termed apocrine-like invasive carcinoma; these carcinomas sometime have estrogen receptor-positive and/or progesterone receptor-positive tumor cells. Both of these carcinomas are described in the last section (Other types of apocrine carcinomas) of this article.

As defined by the criteria established by Vranic and colleagues, PACB is a rare carcinoma that accounts for about 1% of all breast cancers, occurs primarily in postmenopausal females, and usually presents as an asymptomatic mass that in many cases has spread to nearby axillary (i.e. armpit) lymph nodes. While earlier studies used only some of these criteria to diagnose PACB, the studies reviewed here used all four of them.

== Presentation ==
Due to its rarity and more recent definition, PACB studies have generally consisted of small numbers of patients. In these studies, most individuals diagnosed with PACB presented with an asymptomatic breast tumor discovered by self-palpation or screening methods such as mammography. The mammographic features of PACB included a spectrum of dense masses with associated microcalcifications; these findings are non-specific and similar to those seen in, e.g. invasive carcinoma of no special type. Uncommonly, PACB tumors caused breast symptoms such as a pulling sensation, skin puckering, pain, nipple discharge, or overt ulceration. In one study, 41 individuals presenting with PACB were females aged 32–75 years (mean: 59 years) with 12 (53.7%) being over 59 years old, 35 (85.4%) being postmenopausal, and 6 (14.6%) being of childbearing age; their tumors widest diameter was 0.47–10.00 centimeters (cm) (average: 2.4 cm); and axillary lymph node metastases on the same side as the tumor were present in 20 (48.8%) cases. A study of 15 individuals found 5 (33%) with lymph node metastases, again on the same side as the tumor. A study of 18 females all of whom had HER2/new-positive PACB tumors reported that they were 44–83 years old (median age: 55.5 years); 14 (77.8%) were postmenopausal; the widest diameter of their tumors ranged from 0.8 to 5 cm (average: 4 cm); and 9 (50%) had axillary lymph node metastases. These metastases were detected in from 1 to 10 lymph nodes on the same side as the tumor although one individual had metastases in the lymph nodes of both axillae and another had simultaneous metastases in infraclavicular, i.e. below the clavicle, lymph nodes. Rarely, individuals with PACB have presented with metastases in more distant tissues such as in the lymph nodes of the mediastinum (i.e. central compartment of the thoracic cavity) or in the deltopectoral lymph nodes, i.e. lymph nodes situated below the clavicle and between the pectoralis major and deltoid muscles. Also rarely, individuals previously treated for PACB have later presented with recurrence of their disease in sites where the tumors were surgically removed, in the nearby skin or chest wall, and/or in more distant tissues such as a bone or the brain.

== Pathology ==
=== Histopathology ===
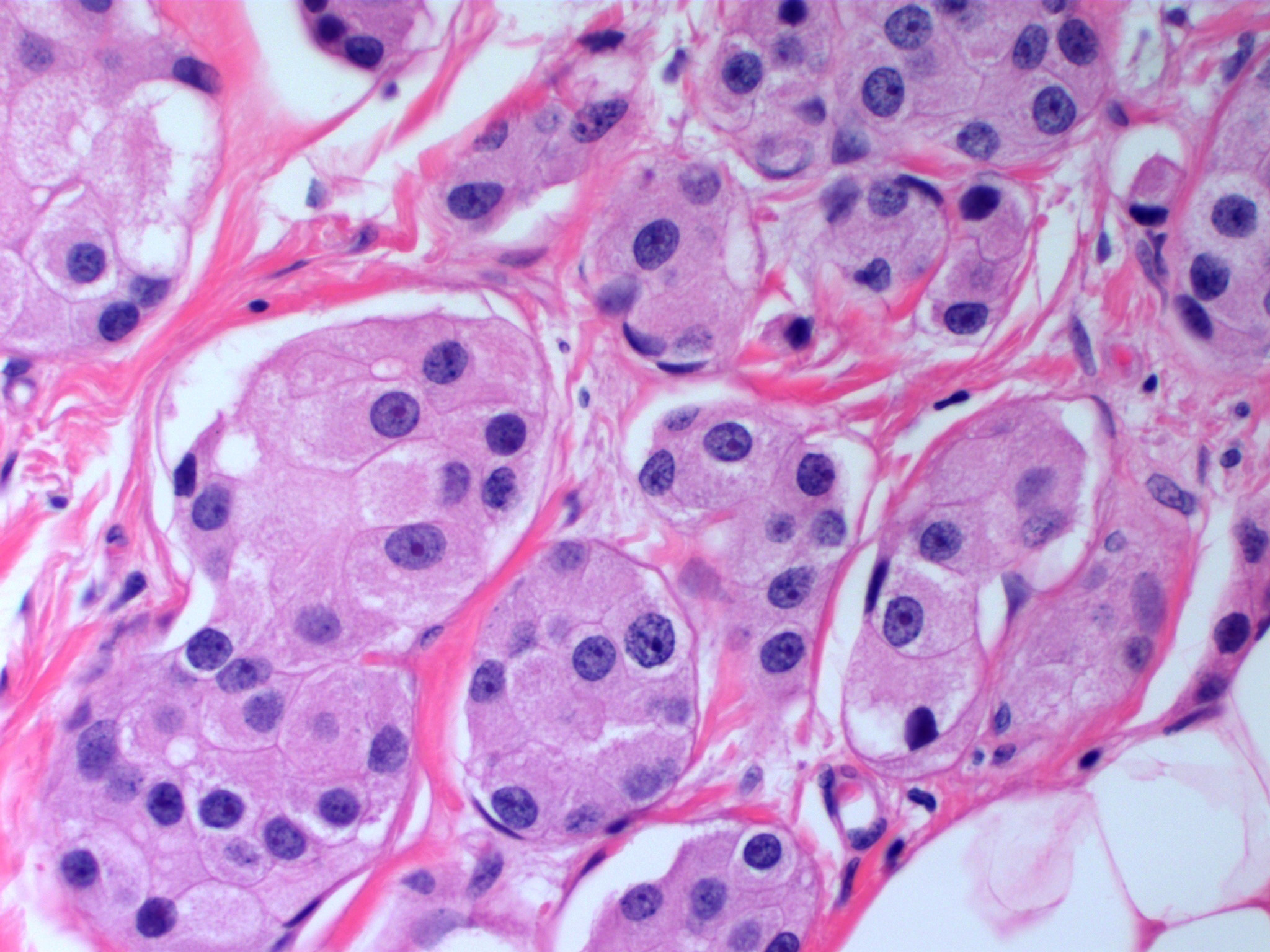
Fig. 2 Breast apocrine carcinoma

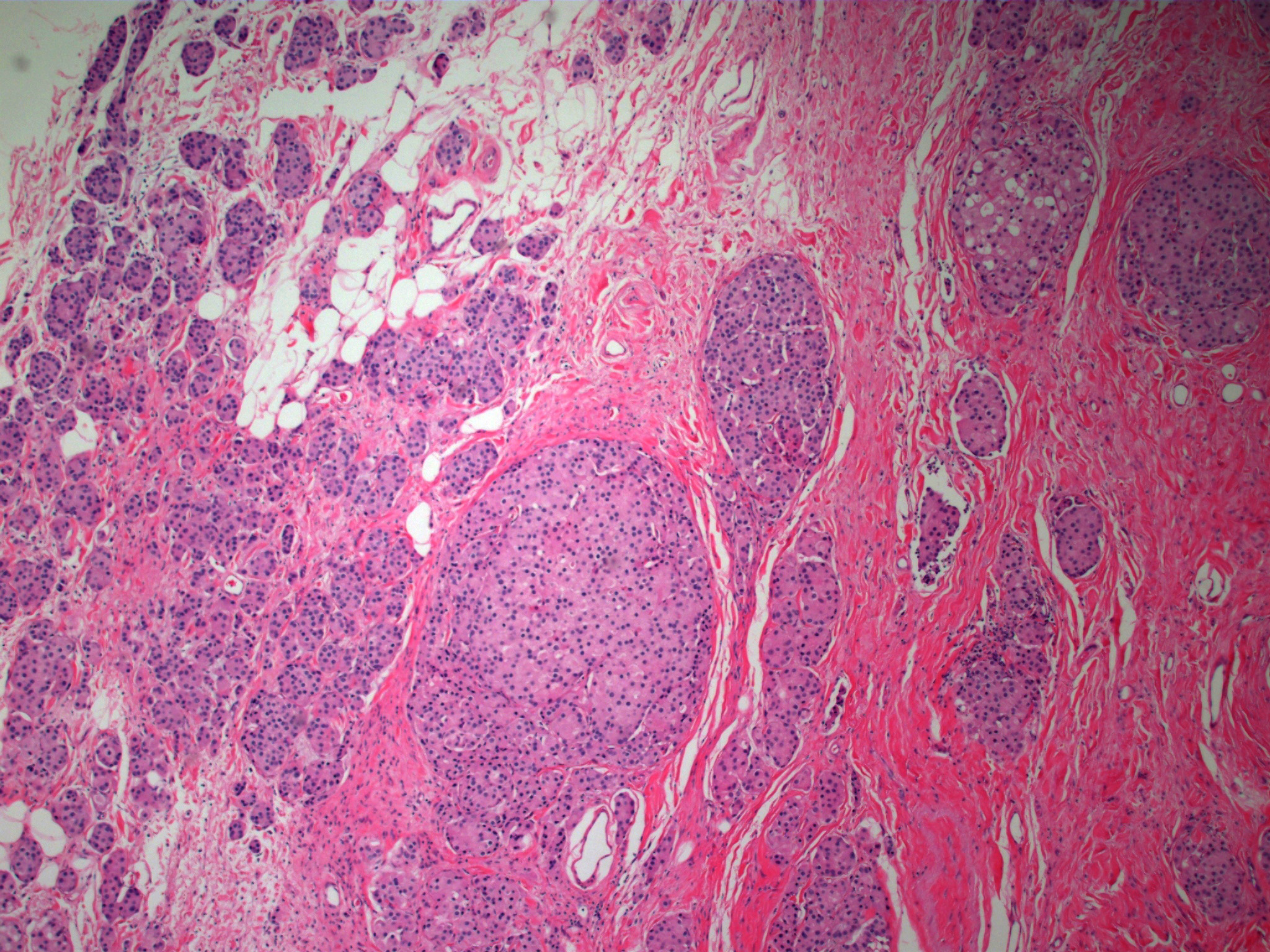
Fig. 3 Breast apocrine carcinoma

The microscopic histopathology of PACB tumors prepared with hematoxylin and eosin staining shows that >90% of the tumors consist of apocrine gland-like tissue. The lesions must also show that tumor cells have broken through their ducts of origin to invade adjacent tissue in at least one area. Most of the tumor cells (termed type A cells) typically appear somewhat more irregular than normal apocrine gland cells. They have abundant eosinophilic (i.e. pink due to the uptake of the eosin dye) cytoplasm which contain numerous granules and large mitochondria. Their nuclei are large, variably sized and shaped, have multiple nucleoli (which are eosinophilic and may be distinctively large in size), and are surrounded by highly visible nuclear membranes. The cells are arranged into solid sheets, nests, papillae, and/or cords (see Figs. 1 and 2). The tumor cells' cytoplasmic granules test positive when treated with the PAS diastase stain. Binucleated cells, i.e. cells with two nuclei, are common. Less commonly, type B apocrine cells are present; these cells have a more foamy and vacuolated cytoplasm (i.e. containing multiple vacuoles) than type A cells and often resemble foamy histiocytes or sebaceous gland cells. The tumor cells have low to moderate rates of proliferation based on their Ki-67 protein levels. PACB tissues may have localized areas that contain mucin-like secretions within their luminal ducts, localized areas of necrosis (i.e. foci containing dead or dying cells), and/or microcalcifications spotted throughout the apocrine tissue. The stroma (i.e. connective tissue between the sheets, nests, papilla and cords of cells) typically contains non-malignant, infiltrating lymphocytes (see Fig. 3). In an examination of 41 PABC tumors, 33 (80.5%) had <50% of their stroma tissues infiltrated with these cells while 8 (19.5%) had ≥50% of their stroma tissues infiltrated with them. Tumors with ≥50% of their stroma infiltrated with lymphocytes tended to have carcinoma cells that had high rates of proliferation. Metastatic and recurrent PACB tumors have a histopathology similar to their original primary tumors.

Using the Nottingham system which classifies breast cancers into 3 grades based or their progressively more aggressive histopathology and potentially poorer prognoses, studies have found the PACB tumors in: a) 20 individuals were grade 1, 2, and 3 tumors in 3, 11, 6 cases, respectively; b) 41 individuals were grade 1, 2, and 3 tumors in 0, 30, and 11 cases, respectively; and c) 18 individuals, all of whom had HER2/neu tumors, were grade 1, 2, or 3 in 1, 11 and 6 cases, respectively. Using the American Joint Committee on guidelines for classifying breast cancer tumors into 4 stages with progressively poorer prognoses based on increasing tumor size (stages I to III) or nearby chest wall or skin involvement or distant tissue metastases (stage 1V): a) the study of 41 cases of PACB reported 5 had stage I, 24 had stage II, 9 had stage III, and 3 had stage IV disease; b) the study of 20 individuals reported 14 had stage I, 4 had stage II, 2 had stage III, and none had stage IV disease; and c) the study of 18 individuals with triple-negative tumors reported 7 had stage I, 9 had stage II, 2 had stage III, and none had stage IV disease.

=== Immunohistochemistry ===
The definition of PACB requires that immunohistochemical analyses find that at least 10% of its cancer cells express androgen receptors but none of these cells express estrogen or progesterone receptors. HER2/neu (which is located on the surface membrane of cells) is not upregulated, and therefore scored as HER/neu-negative, in 43%, 58.5%, 70.8%, or 90% of PACB cases. HER/neu-negative PACB is one of the triple-negative breast cancers (TNBCs). TNBCs are a group of estrogen receptor-, androgen receptor-, and HER2/neu-negative tumors that account for 10%-15% of all breast cancers and are particularly aggressive cancers that generally have a poorer prognosis than other breast cancer subtypes. HER2/neu is in the epidermal growth factor receptor family. Another member of this family, epidermal growth factor receptor (also termed Her1) is sometimes (e.g. 6% of cases) overexpressed in PACB, particularly in cases that are HER2/neu-negative.

All PACB cases have tumor cells which express the alpha-methylacyl-CoA racemase protein and nearly all of these cases have tumor cells which express the GATA3 protein. The identification of these two proteins in tumor cells has helped support the diagnosis of PACB. Prolactin-induced protein, a product of the PIP gene, has been reported to be expressed by the tumor cells in up to 75% of PABC tumors in earlier studies and 100% (26 of 26 cases) in a more recent study. Since this protein is commonly expressed in many other types of breast carcinoma, its identification has not useful for diagnosing PACB. Finally, a study of 14 individuals with PACB found that 7 had infiltrating lymphocytes that expressed PD-L1 (i.e. programmed death-ligand 1), a protein that when upregulated may allow cancer cells to evade the host immune system. However, another study found that only 2 of 17 cases had PACB infiltrating lymphocytes that expressed PD-L1 protein.

=== Gene abnormalities ===
A study of 14 individuals with PACB reported that their tumor cells commonly had abnormalities in genes that code for proteins in three intercellular signaling pathways known to be responsible for regulating cell growth, proliferation, and/or survival. These pathways were the PI3K/AKT/mTOR, cyclin-dependent kinase, and MAPK/ERK pathways. All of these pathways, when dysregulated, are implicated in promoting the development and/or progression of various types of breast cancers. The most commonly identified gene mutations in the carcinoma cells of 18 individuals with PACB were the PIK3CA gene in 12, PTEN tumor suppressor gene in 6, and TP53 tumor suppressor gene in 5 individuals. Less commonly, these cells had mutations in the BRAF, HRAS, KRAS, proto-oncogenes, or MAP3K1 gene all of which are in MAPK/ERK pathways, the CK4, CK6A, CK6B, or CK6C gene in the cyclin-dependent pathways, and the FGF2 gene (i.e. the basic fibroblast growth factor gene). One or more of these dysregulated pathways and mutated genes, many studies suggest, contribute to the development and/or progression of PACB tumors.

== Diagnosis ==
The diagnosis of PACB is based on its histopathology which should show an invasive tumor consisting of >90% apocrine morphology (see histopathology section) with apocrine-like cancinoma cells that do not express estrogen or progesterone receptors but in at least 10% of these cells do express the androgen receptor. The uptake of PAS diastase stain by the tumor's carcinoma cells' cytoplasmic granules can aid in making the diagnosis. PACB is distinguished from three other very rare breast cancers with which it shares a similar morphology. Oncocytic carcinoma of the breast differs from PABC in being composed of tumor cells dominated by excessive numbers of mitochondria. Granular cell tumor of the breast and breast tumors consisting predominantly of cells with foamy cytoplasm resembling histiocytes (i.e. histiocytoid variant of invasive lobular carcinoma also termed hystiocytoid breast carcinoma) differ from PACB in that their cancer cells do not express GATA3 or alpha-methylacyl-CoA racemase but do express the S100 protein.

== Treatment and prognosis ==
PACB tumors have commonly been treated with regimens similar to those used to treat various non-apocrine breast carcinomas. The standard treatment for PACB has been tumor removal using either breast-conserving surgery or mastectomy with removal of any nearby axillary lymph nodes suspected of containing metastases. Because of the predicted severity of their tumors presentation and histopathology, almost all patients are further treated with a) radiation therapy to the involved areas, administered as adjuvant therapy after surgery or as neoadjuvant therapy before surgery; b) a chemotherapy regimen, administered after or before surgery; and/or c) in HER2/neu-positive cases, trastuzumab, which is a monoclonal antibody that binds to HER2/neu protein thereby suppressing its pro-cancerous actions. In a study of 41 cases, the 5 year overall survival rate was 100% for individuals with HER2/neu-positive PACB tumors and ~72% for individuals with HER2/neu-negative PACB tumors. Since 9 of the 17 HER2/neu-positive individuals in this study received a HER2/Neu-targeting drug, trastuzumab (brand name Herceptin), these results, although not statistically significant, suggest that individuals with HER2/neu-positive PACB may be benefited by adding a HER2/neu-targeted drug to their treatment regimen. Paradoxically, the 5 year overall survival rate in this study for individuals with slower proliferating tumors (Ki-67 ≤20%) was lower, 67%, than that for individuals with faster growing tumors (Ki-67 >20%), ~94%; again, this difference was not statistically significant. In a study of 18 individuals with NER2/neu-negative PACB, 17 were treated with mastectomy and one was treated with breast-conserving surgery; 14 of these individuals were also treated with chemotherapy and 4 with radiation therapy. None of these individuals were treated with a drug targeting HER2/neu. After a median follow-up of 76.5 months, 15 individuals had no disease-related morbidity or mortality while 2 individuals developed distant tissue metastases and one had died. There is little data on the optimal treatment for, or long term (e.g. >10 years) results of, these currently used treatments for PACB.

Many researchers have recommended a) conducting a much larger study to verify the results suggesting that the addition of a HER2/neu inhibitor to standard therapeutic regimens improves the overall survival of individuals with HER2/neu-positive PACB; b) studies to determine if androgen receptor inhibitors (e.g. bicalutamide) or treatments that target the dysregulated PI3K/AKT/mTOR pathway, the cyclin-dependent kinase pathways, and/or the Ras-Raf-MEK-ERK pathway have a role in treating PACB; and c) conducting more comprehensive studies that profile PACB tumors to identify other potential therapeutic targets and regimens for treating this carcinoma.

== Other types of apocrine carcinomas ==
=== Apocrine ductal carcinoma in situ ===
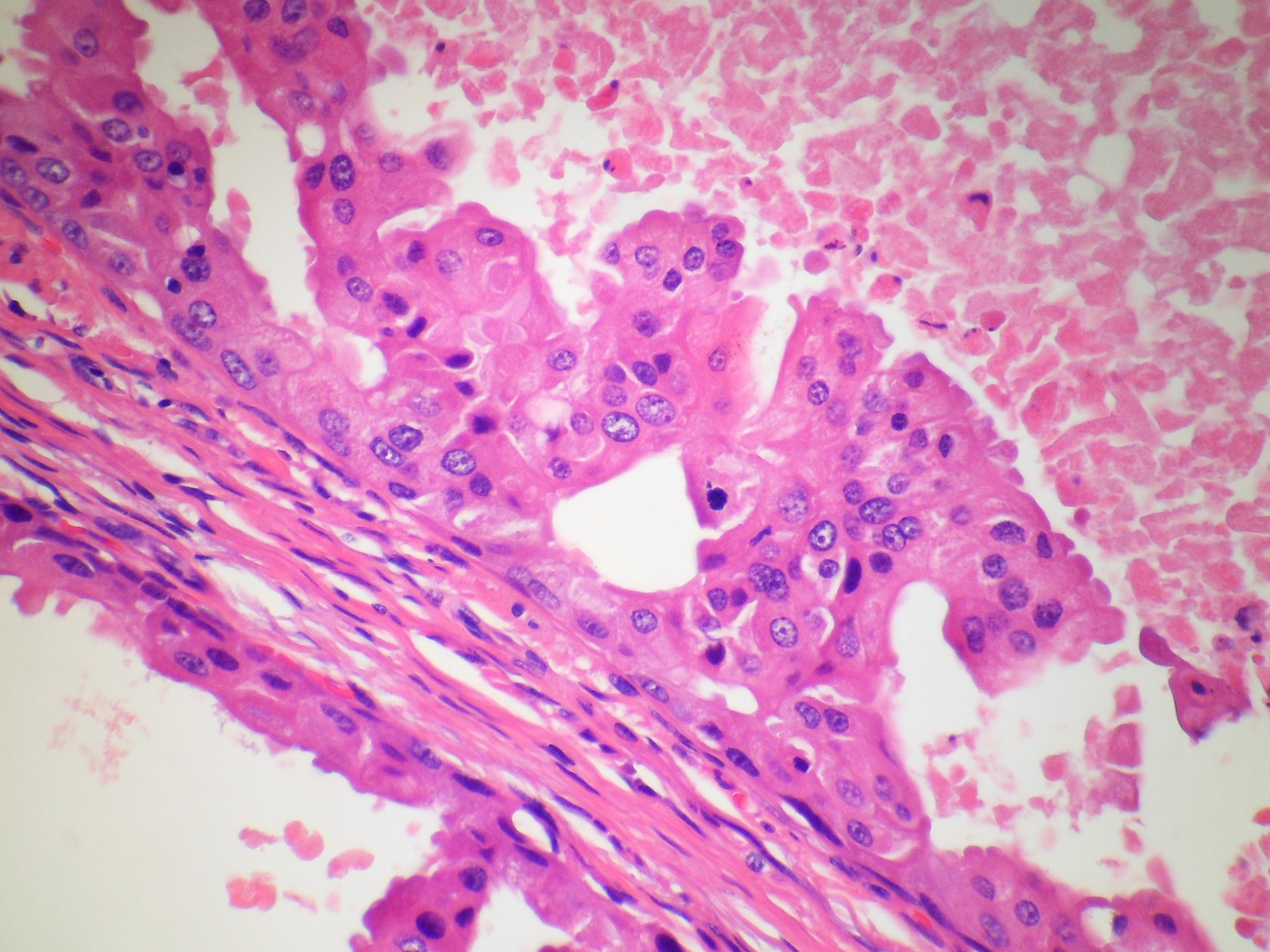
Fig 4. Apocrine ductal carcinoma in situ

Non-invasive apocrine carcinoma of the breast, i.e. apocrine carcinoma in situ, is classified as a variant of the ductal carcinoma in situ tumors of the breast; it is therefore termed apocrine ductal carcinoma in situ (ADCIS). ADCIS tumors have appreciable areas with apocrine tissue-like histopathology, i.e. areas composed of apocrine cells that have, to varying extents, the abnormal cytoplasmic, nuclear, and nucleolar features found in PACB (see Fig 4). Unlike PACB, the apocrine carcinoma cells in ADCIS have by definition not spread beyond their ducts of origin to invade nearby non-ductal tissue and have not metastasized to local lymph nodes or distant tissues. While there is no consensus on the criteria used for its diagnosis, ADCIS is most often defined as a non-invasive breast tumor consisting of lactiferous ducts that are filled with neoplastic apocrine cells; the cells in these tumors, similar to those in PACB, are estrogen receptor-negative, progesterone-receptor negative, and, in at least 10% of these cells, androgen receptor-positive. Some studies have classified ADCIS as low, intermediate, or high nuclear grade based on how closely the nuclei of their tumor's apocrine cells resemble the nuclei of normal breast cells. In general, high nuclear grade tumor cells have more abnormal nuclei and indicate that this tumor is more aggressive than a lower grade tumor. Low- and intermediate-grade ADCIS tumors may be misdiagnosed as non-cancerous lesions (e.g. as atypical apocrine metaplasia or atypical apocrine hyperplasia) because of their more benign microscopic appearance. ADCIS tumors often have architectural patterns consisting of cribriform (riddled with small holes), micropapillary (thin finger-like growths) and/or solid growth (i.e. do not contain cysts or liquid areas), sites with necrosis, and/or sites with microcalcifications; while these microscopic findings are more common in high nuclear grade ADCIS, their presence supports the diagnosis of ADCIS in low and intermediate tumors. Some authors have proposed that in situ ductal tumors with apocrine histopathology should be larger than 0.2 centimeters in order to be diagnosed as ADCIS.

A study of 22 females aged 31 to 84 years (average age: 59 years) diagnosed with ADCIS reported that on presentation, 9 were asymptomatic (tumors detected by mammography), 11 were palpable breast masses with 2 of them associated with a nipple discharge and 2 of them diagnosed in females with Paget's disease of the breast (Two cases had no information on their presentations). None of the 22 individuals had invasive or metastatic disease including 9 who had armpit lymph node removals to investigate for metastases. The tumors ranged from 0.7 to 6 cm (mean: 2.3 cm) in size. On microscopic examination, the tumors had a microscopic histopathology similar to PACB tumors with 10 cases showing a cribriform pattern and 5 showing a micropapillary pattern. The tumors were estrogen receptor-negative, progesterone receptor-negative, and androgen receptor-positive in all cases except for one case with borderline estrogen receptor-positivity and another case with progesterone receptor-positivity. Ten of these individuals had HER2/neu-positive tumors. In the 17 individuals for whom this information was available, mastectomy, modified mastectomy, and simple mastectomy were performed in 8, 7, and 1 case, respectively; 5 also received adjuvant (i.e. post-surgery) radiotherapy. All of the treated individuals were alive without evidence of disease or recurrences from 9 to 194 months (average observation time: 37 months) after surgery. In a more recent study of 28 females (mean age:56 years) presenting with ADCIS: 28 had estrogen receptor-negative and androgen receptor-positive tumors; 25 (89.3% ) had progesterone-negative tumors; 9 (32.1%) had HER2/neu-positive tumors; 27 had tumors cells that expressed the α-methylacyl-CoA racemase protein; and 27 had tumor cells that expressed the prolactin-inducible protein. These results were virtually identical to those found in PACB tumor cells except for the 3 individuals with progesterone receptor-positive ADCIS tumor cells. During the follow-up period (15–55 months, mean: 32.0 months), all of the females were alive. The potential for ADCIS tumors to progress to a more malignant form is unclear but must be considered as a possibility.

=== Apocrine-like invasive carcinoma ===
Apocrine-like invasive carcinoma (ALIC), also termed apocrine-like carcinoma or invasive carcinoma with apocrine differentiation, has been defined as an invasive carcinoma that consists of a PACB-like microscopic histopathology in 10% to 90% of its tumor tissues or a PACB-like microscopic histopathology in >90% of its tumor tissues but, unlike PACB, has tumor cells which are estrogen receptor-positive and/or progesterone receptor-positive. Reports on individuals with ALIC have been rare. A study published in 2013 compared 25 individuals presenting with ALIC to 44 with PACB. There were no significant differences between the two groups in age, tumor size, or lymph node metastases although patients with PACB had higher (50%), but statistically insignificant, rates of lymph note metastases than patients with ALIC (36%). These metastases were found in 1 to 10 lymph nodes of the patients. PABC tumors did have statistically significant increased aggressive histopathology and higher grades compared to ALIC tumors. Tumor grading was based on the Nottingham system, also termed the Elston and Ellis modification, which scores the tumor cells' tubule formation, nuclear pleomorphism, and mitotic counts (see Nottingham system for grading breast cancer tumors). A higher grade tumor is more likely to have a poorer prognosis than a lower grade tumor. The patients were treated with mastectomy or more conservative breast surgery in all cases and, where deemed appropriate, with intraoperative electron radiation therapy or post-surgery radiotherapy in 35 and 24 individuals with PABC and ALIC, respectively. Possibly due to their tumors' greater rate of metastases, more aggressive histopathology, and higher grade, more than half of the individuals with PABC were also treated with chemotherapy and/or hormone therapy; individuals with ALIC did not receive these additional treatments. Relapse rates including those occurring at or near the original tumor site, spread to distant tissues, and/or occurrences in the opposite breast were 7.3% and 3.3% for individuals with PABC and ALIC, respectively. (Patients with either PACB or ALIC had an increased risk of developing a cancer in the opposite breast compared to a control group of patients with Invasive carcinoma of no special type). Ten year disease-free survival rates were about 50% and 70% and ten year overall survival rates (i.e. surviving patients minus patients who died from any cause) were about 80% and 90% for individuals with PABC and ALIC, respectively. The difference in disease-free survival rates (but not the overall survival rates) between individuals with PABC and ALIC was significant. Further studies with larger numbers of patients are required to further define the features of ALIC and accurately compare its long-term prognosis to PACB as well as other breast cancer tumors.
