= Cytokeratin 5/6 antibodies =

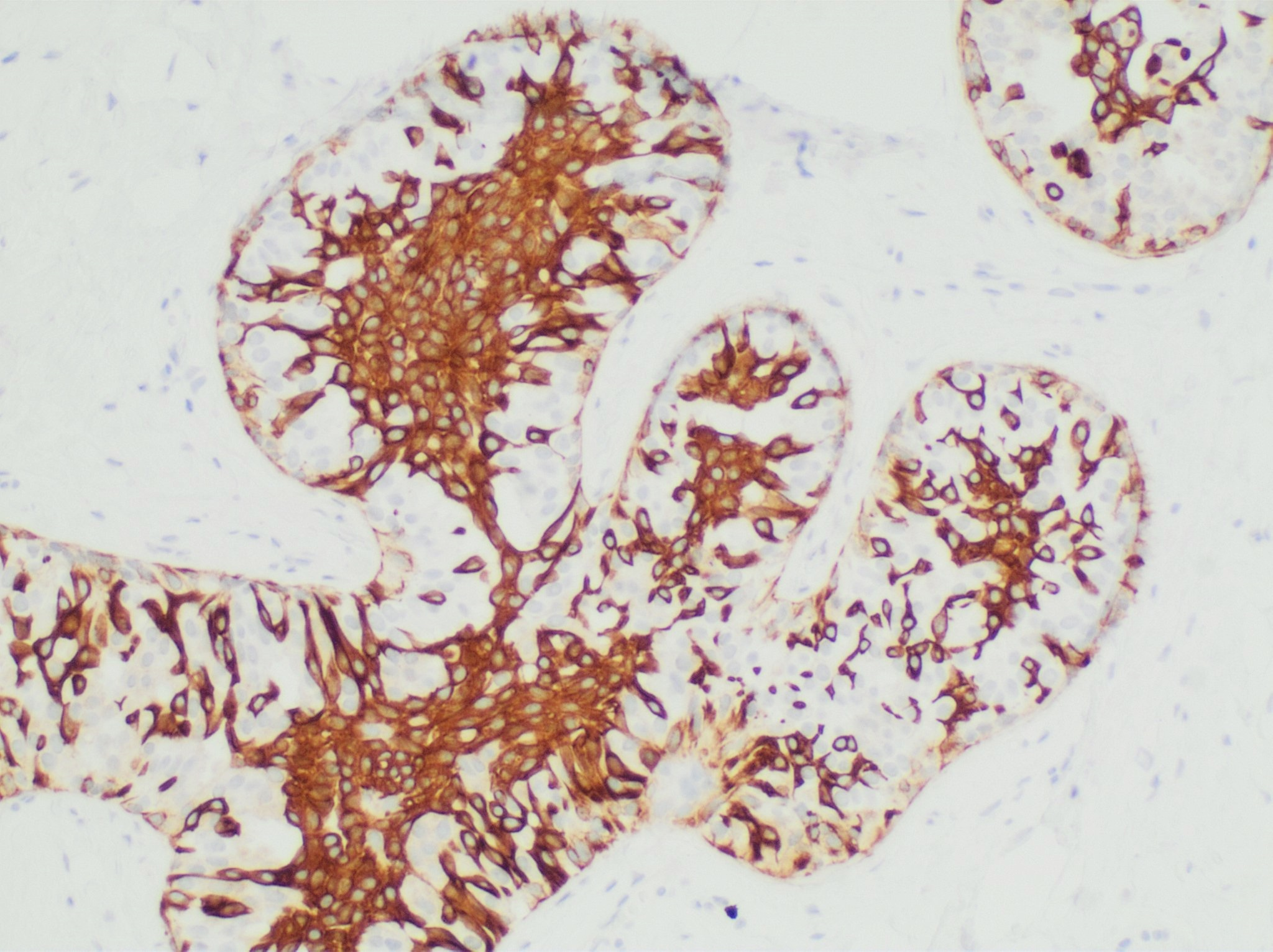
Immunohistochemistry with cytokeratin 5/6 antibodies in usual ductal hyperplasia, showing a mosaic pattern, predominantly in the central zone.

Cytokeratin 5/6 antibodies are antibodies that target both cytokeratin 5 and cytokeratin 6. These are used in immunohistochemistry, often called CK 5/6 staining, including the following applications:

- Identifying basal cells or myoepithelial cells in the breast and prostate.
- For breast pathology, also in distinguishing usual ductal hyperplasia (UDH) and papillary lesions (having a mosaic-like pattern) from ductal carcinoma in situ, which is usually negative. Cyclin D1 and CK5/6 staining could be used in concert to distinguish between the diagnosis of papilloma (Cyclin D1 < 4.20%, CK 5/6 positive) or papillary carcinoma (Cyclin D1 > 37.00%, CK 5/6 negative).
- In the lung, distinguishing epithelioid mesothelioma (CK5/6 positive in 83%) from lung adenocarcinoma (CK5/6 negative in 85%).

Until recently the diagnostic method predominantly depended on identifying antibodies' responses that are positive for adenocarcinoma and negative for mesothelioma.

== Overview ==
Cytokeratin 5/6 (CK5/6) is a biomarker that has emerged as a valuable tool in distinguishing epithelioid pleural mesothelioma from metastatic adenocarcinoma. In a study comparing its effectiveness with other markers, CK5/6 showed high sensitivity, staining positively in 92% of epithelioid pleural mesothelioma cases. In contrast, only 14% of metastatic adenocarcinomas were positive for CK5/6. Cytokeratin 5/6 also stains reactive mesothelium, which limits its specificity. Overall, CK5/6, along with other markers like calretinin and thrombomodulin, demonstrates high sensitivity for epithelioid mesothelioma, making it a valuable tool in diagnostic pathology.

== See also ==
- Histochemistry and Cell Biology
