= Victor Selmanowitz =

Victor Joel Selmanowitz was an American dermatologist. In 1970, he coined the term unilateral nevoid telangiectasia. The Victor J. Selmanowitz Memorial Lecture and chair of modern Jewish history at the Touro College Graduate School of Jewish Studies is named for him.

== Selected publications ==
- Selmanowitz, V. J.; Porter, M. J. (March 1967). "The Sjögren-Larsson syndrome". The American Journal of Medicine. 42 (3): 412–422. doi:10.1016/0002-9343(67)90269-0. ISSN 0002-9343. PMID 6018858.
- Selmanowiz, Victor J. (1 July 1970). "Unilateral Nevoid Telangiectasia". Annals of Internal Medicine. 73 (1): 87–90. doi:10.7326/0003-4819-73-1-87. ISSN 0003-4819. PMID 5433282.
- Selmanowitz, V. J.; Orentreich, N. (November 1977). "Medical-grade fluid silicone. A monographic review". The Journal of Dermatologic Surgery and Oncology. 3 (6): 597–611. doi:10.1111/j.1524-4725.1977.tb00366.x. ISSN 0148-0812. PMID 338654.
