= Keratin 6C =

Protein found in humans

KRT6C

Identifiers
- Aliases: KRT6C, keratin 6C, K6E, KRT6E, PPKNEFD
- External IDs: OMIM: 612315; MGI: 1333768; GeneCards: KRT6C

Gene location (Human)
Chr.	Chromosome 12 (human)
Band	12q13.13	Start	52,468,516 bp
Band	12q13.13	End	52,473,805 bp

Gene location (Mouse)
Chr.	Chromosome 15 (mouse)
Band	15 F2|15 56.97 cM	Start	101,584,458 bp
Band	15 F2|15 56.97 cM	End	101,588,722 bp
RNA expression pattern
Bgee	Human / Mouse (ortholog); Top expressed in: mucosa of esophagus; thymus; vagina; skin of abdomen; ectocervix; tonsil; skin of leg; minor salivary glands; sural nerve; right coronary artery / Top expressed in: conjunctival fornix; ciliary body; corneal stroma; cervix; retinal pigment epithelium; epithelium of lens; lip; umbilical cord; iris; sexually immature organism; More reference expression data
BioGPS	n/a
Gene ontology
Molecular function	protein binding; structural molecule activity
Cellular component	keratin filament; extracellular exosome; intermediate filament; cytosol
Biological process	intermediate filament cytoskeleton organization; keratinization; cornification
Sources:Amigo / QuickGO
Orthologs
Databases	NCBI: entry; OMA: entry
Species	Human	Mouse
Entrez	286887	16688
Ensembl	ENSG00000170465	ENSMUSG00000023041
UniProt	P48668	Q9Z331; Q3UV11
RefSeq (mRNA)	NM_173086	NM_010669
RefSeq (protein)	NP_775109	NP_034799
Location (UCSC)	Chr 12: 52.47 – 52.47 Mb	Chr 15: 101.58 – 101.59 Mb
PubMed search
- Wikidata
View/Edit Human	View/Edit Mouse

Keratin 6C (protein name K6C; gene name KRT6C) is a type II cytokeratin, one of a number of isoforms of keratin 6 encoded by separate genes located within the type II keratin gene cluster on human chromosome 12q. This gene was uncovered recently by the Human Genome Project and its expression patterns in humans remains unknown.

== Keratins ==
Keratins are the intermediate filament proteins that form a dense meshwork of filaments throughout the cytoplasm of epithelial cells. Keratins form heteropolymers consisting of a type I and a type II keratin. Keratins are generally expressed in particular pairs of type I and type II keratin proteins in a tissue-specific and cellular differentiation-specific manner.

The keratin proteins of epithelial tissues are commonly known as "keratins" or are sometimes referred to as "epithelial keratins" or "cytokeratins". The specialized keratins of hair and nail are known as "hard keratins" or "trichocyte keratins". Trichocytes are the specialized epithelial cells from which hair and nail are composed. Trichocyte keratins are similar in their gene and protein structure to keratins except that they are especially rich in the sulfur-containing amino acid cysteine, which facilitates chemical cross-linking of the assembled hard keratins to form a more structurally resilient material.

Both epithelial keratins and hard keratins can be further subdivided into type I (acidic) keratins and type II (neutral-basic) keratins. The genes for the type I keratins are located in a gene cluster on human chromosome 17q, whereas the genes for type II keratins are located in a cluster on human chromosome 12q (the exception being K18, a type I keratin located in the type II gene cluster).

Like the closely related KRT6A and KRT6B genes, the KRT6C gene consists of 9 exons separated by 8 introns and is located in the type II keratin gene cluster on human chromosome 12q. Keratin 6A and keratin 6B are encoded by the neighbouring genes, which are identical in intron-exon organization to KRT6C and are more than 99% identical in their DNA coding sequences.

== Genetic disorders ==
Mutations in K6C have been identified as being able to cause diffuse and focal palmoplantar keratodermas. This has been identified as a form of Pachyonychia congenita.
