= Usual ductal hyperplasia =

Benign lesion of the breast

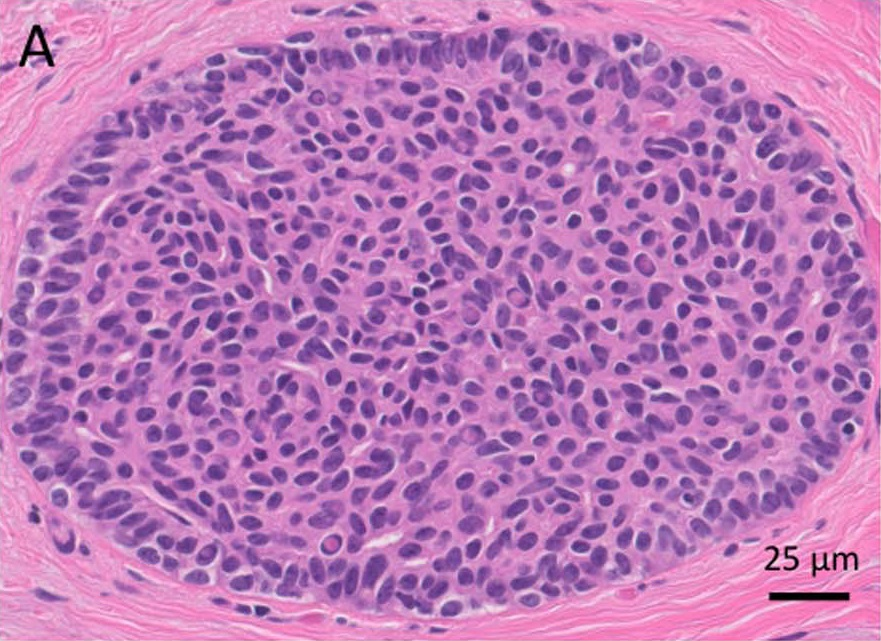
Usual ductal hyperplasia with small cells that lack atypia.

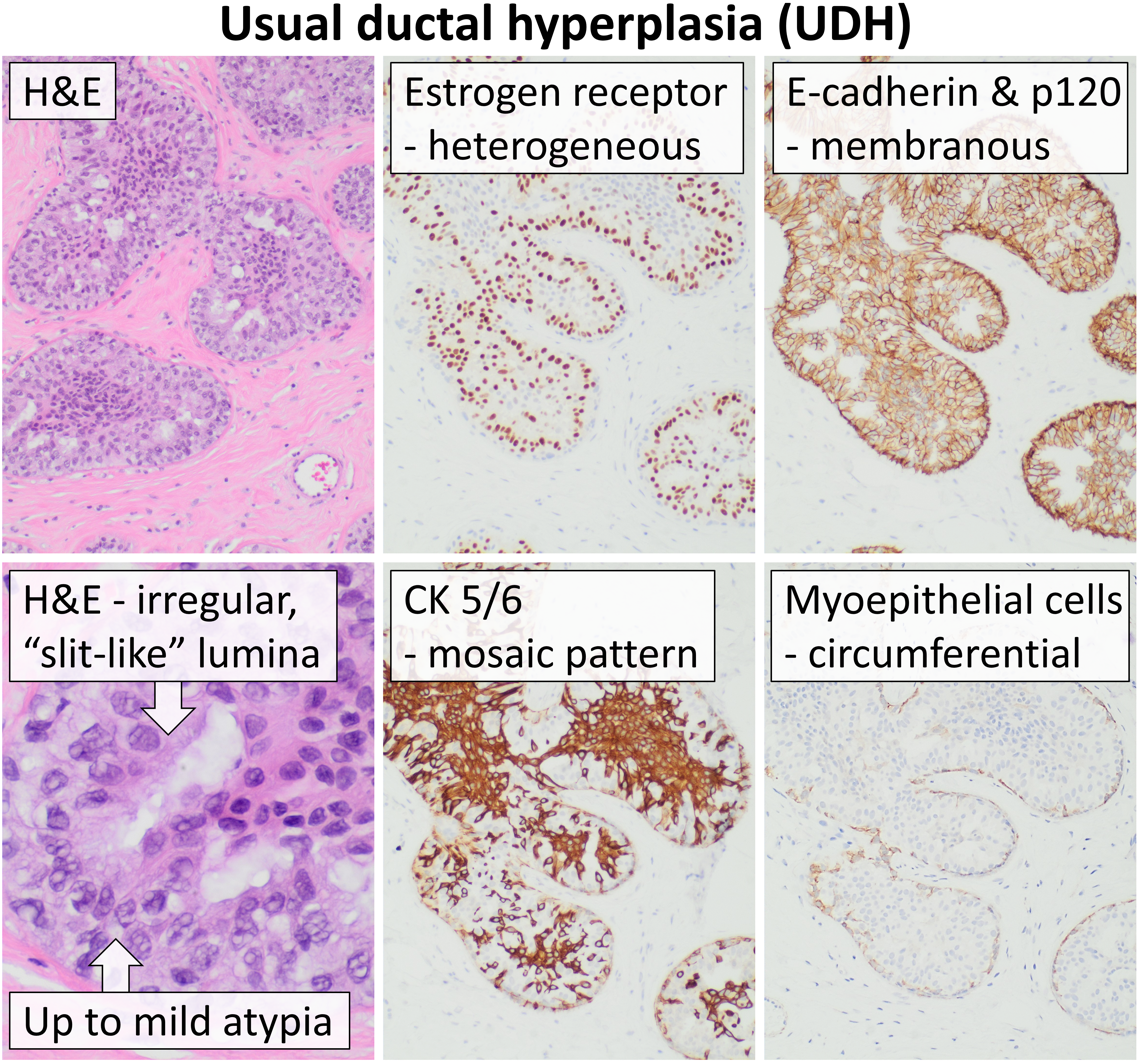
Histopathology of usual ductal hyperplasia (UDH) on H&E stain and immunohistochemistry. As seen on higher magnification H&E stain at left, it has the usual irregular "slit-like" lumina. However, this case had almost moderate atypia with somewhat enlarged vesicular nuclei in the periphery, and therefore immunohistochemistry was performed that confirmed UDH: Estrogen receptor showing heterogeneous positivity, rather than the diffusely positive expression seen in atypical ductal hyperplasia (ADH); CK 5/6 with a mosaic pattern, predominantly in the central zone, rather than the negative expression seen in ADH; E-cadherin and p120 showing membranous staining, rather than being negative and cytoplasmic, respectively, in lobular carcinoma in situ; Myoepithelial cell stain (calponin in this case) showing circumferential staining, rather than the absent staining seen in breast cancer.

Usual ductal hyperplasia (UDH) is a benign lesion of the breast wherein cells look very similar to normal. It is a spectrum of changes that can range from minimal stratification of cells to proliferations that are just short of atypical ductal hyperplasia.

== Histopathology ==
Usual ductal hyperplasia is typically a cohesive proliferation with haphazard, jumbled cell arrangement or streaming growth pattern. Cells have mild variation in cellular and nuclear size and shape.
