= Keratin 16 =

Protein found in humans

KRT16

Identifiers
- Aliases: KRT16, CK16, FNEPPK, K16, K1CP, KRT16A, NEPPK, PC1, keratin 16
- External IDs: OMIM: 148067; MGI: 96690; GeneCards: KRT16

Gene location (Human)
Chr.	Chromosome 17 (human)
Band	17q21.2	Start	41,609,778 bp
Band	17q21.2	End	41,615,899 bp

Gene location (Mouse)
Chr.	Chromosome 11 (mouse)
Band	11|11 D	Start	100,136,917 bp
Band	11|11 D	End	100,139,728 bp
RNA expression pattern
Bgee	Human / Mouse (ortholog); Top expressed in: gingival epithelium; hair follicle; buccal mucosa cell; amniotic fluid; skin of abdomen; skin of leg; periodontal fiber; cervix epithelium; body of tongue; epithelium of esophagus / Top expressed in: lip; middle ear; epidermis; Eustachian tube; zone of skin; olfactory system; corneal epithelium; urethra; vagina; mandibular molars; More reference expression data
BioGPS	n/a
Gene ontology
Molecular function	structural constituent of cytoskeleton; protein binding; structural molecule activity
Cellular component	extracellular exosome; cytoskeleton; intermediate filament; nucleus; cytosol
Biological process	morphogenesis of an epithelium; hair cycle; keratinocyte migration; ageing; cell population proliferation; inflammatory response; negative regulation of cell migration; innate immune response; cytoskeleton organization; keratinocyte differentiation; epidermis development; intermediate filament cytoskeleton organization; establishment of skin barrier; keratinization; cornification
Sources:Amigo / QuickGO
Orthologs
Databases	NCBI: entry; OMA: entry
Species	Human	Mouse
Entrez	3868	16666
Ensembl	ENSG00000186832	ENSMUSG00000053797
UniProt	P08779	Q9Z2K1
RefSeq (mRNA)	NM_005557	NM_008470; NM_001313958
RefSeq (protein)	NP_005548	NP_001300887; NP_032496
Location (UCSC)	Chr 17: 41.61 – 41.62 Mb	Chr 11: 100.14 – 100.14 Mb
PubMed search
- Wikidata
View/Edit Human	View/Edit Mouse

Keratin 16 is a protein that in humans is encoded by the KRT16 gene.

Keratin 16 is a type I cytokeratin. It is paired with keratin 6 in a number of epithelial tissues, including nail bed, esophagus, tongue, and hair follicles. Mutations in the gene encoding this protein are associated with the genetic skin disorders including pachyonychia congenita, non-epidermolytic palmoplantar keratoderma and unilateral palmoplantar verrucous nevus.
