= Comedocarcinoma =

- Specialty: Oncology

Comedocarcinoma is a kind of breast cancer that demonstrates comedonecrosis, which is the central necrosis of cancer cells within involved ducts. Comedocarcinomas are usually non-infiltrating and intraductal tumors, characterized as a comedo-type, high-grade ductal carcinoma in situ (DCIS). However, there have been accounts of comedocarcinoma which has then diversified into other cell types and developed into infiltrating (invasive) ductal carcinoma. Recurrence and survival rates differ for invasive breast cancer which has originated as comedocarcinoma compared with other types of cancer cells.

== Pathophysiology ==
Cancer cells within these tumors are highly proliferative. As such, this can result in a lack of sufficient nutrients to some cells; leading to their starvation. As these starved cells die off, a build up of dead cancer cells will begin to form inside the tumor. These groups of necrotic cells are often referred to as comedones, hence the classification of this type of high-grade DCIS as "comedo necrosis".

As of yet, it is still unclear the mechanism by which DCIS of the breast develop into a comedo-type morphology. However, a strong correlation between Tenascin and DCIS nuclear grade has been shown. In a pathological analysis, tenascin was present in all excised tissue from carcinomas. It was found that there were variations in the expression patterns of tenascin in comedo DCIS (comedocarcinoma) versus non-comedo DCIS. Specifically, numerous and thick tenascin bands were found in the surrounding stroma of comedo DCIS whereas non-comedo DCIS had a single thin tenascin band surrounding them. The difference in these expression patterns implicates Tenascin as a possible factor in the development of the comedo-type morphology in carcinomas.

== Morphology ==
=== Cells ===
Comedocarcinomas are typically marked by the presence of large, abnormal cells within the breast. These cells are often pleomorphic and have irregular nuclei and prominent nucleoli. The tumor cells are poorly differentiated and are therefore recognized as high-grade (i.e. grade 3).

=== Tissue ===
Affected ducts have characteristic necrotic tissue which is composed of multiple, well-defined firm masses of dead cells. In most cases of comedocarcinomas (approximately 78%), mammograms will reveal micro-calcifications in the breast tissue due to the calcification of necrotic elements. Upon physical examination, the infected area can often be described as feeling hard and cord-like. Once excised, sustained pressure to the tumor will cause inspissated material—that is cheese-like in appearance (resembling comedones in acne) and similar in consistency to toothpaste—to ooze from the ducts. This cheesy appearance is as a direct result of the clogging of ducts with necrotic elements.

== Clinical Relevance ==
=== Pathology ===
Comedocarcinomas are known as the most aggressive form of intraductal carcinomas, although they are considered to be an early stage of breast cancer and are classified as noninvasive.

Individuals diagnosed with comedo-type DCIS (comedocarcinoma) often have a higher chance of it developing into an invasive derivative—if left untreated, this chance is nearly 100%. These individuals are also at an increased risk of cancer recurrence, with this recurrence manifesting itself earlier than in other forms of DCIS. The prognosis for comedocarcinoma is usually favorable with treatment intervention (i.e. surgery, radiotherapy, or hormone therapy); leading to a lower risk of invasive carcinoma development.

=== Diagnosis ===
Diagnosis of comedocarcinoma is typically done using a combination of methods. A physical examination of the breast tissue can often reveal lumps in comedocarcinomas, while palpable lumps are rare in non-comedo carcinomas. Usually, a mammogram or biopsy is often needed to fully diagnose comedocarcinomas. Because of its prevalence in DCIS, evidence of calcification within the breast tissue is often used as a diagnostic tool for identifying comedocarcinomas and other forms of DCIS. Biopsies are normally only performed following a suspicious mammogram (i.e. possible evidence of comedocarcinoma), and in such cases invasive biopsies are seldom necessary for diagnosing comedocarcinomas. Following the biopsy, a pathological examination is performed on the portion of excised breast tissue. If the results of the examination show the appearance of highly proliferative, abnormal cells that are confined within their place of origin, this is indicative of cancer and an in-situ carcinoma diagnosis is made. The presence of E-cadherin can also be used by pathologists to distinguish an in-situ carcinoma as lobular or ductal—where the loss of E-cadherin expression is indicative of lobular in-situ carcinoma. To then classify the DCIS as a comedo-type (comedocarcinoma), the cancer cells need to show evidence of comedonecrosis and poor differentiation.
