= C19orf25 =

Protein-coding gene in the species Homo sapiens

Identifiers
- Aliases: C19orf25, chromosome 19 open reading frame 25
- External IDs: MGI: 1913624; HomoloGene: 11959; GeneCards: C19orf25; OMA:C19orf25 - orthologs

Gene location (Human)
Chr.	Chromosome 19 (human)
Band	19p13.3	Start	1,461,143 bp
Band	19p13.3	End	1,479,219 bp

Gene location (Mouse)
Chr.	Chromosome 10 (mouse)
Band	10|10 C1	Start	80,154,088 bp
Band	10|10 C1	End	80,156,371 bp
RNA expression pattern
Bgee	Human / Mouse (ortholog); Top expressed in: C1 segment; cingulate gyrus; anterior cingulate cortex; right frontal lobe; amygdala; granulocyte; Brodmann area 9; hypothalamus; mucosa of transverse colon; prefrontal cortex / Top expressed in: granulocyte; yolk sac; lip; duodenum; right kidney; epithelium of small intestine; proximal tubule; intestinal villus; fetal liver hematopoietic progenitor cell; jejunum; More reference expression data
BioGPS	n/a
Orthologs
Species	Human	Mouse
Entrez	148223	66374
Ensembl	ENSG00000119559	ENSMUSG00000020133
UniProt	Q9UFG5	Q9D7E4
RefSeq (mRNA)	NM_152482	NM_025521
RefSeq (protein)	NP_689695	NP_079797
Location (UCSC)	Chr 19: 1.46 – 1.48 Mb	Chr 10: 80.15 – 80.16 Mb
PubMed search
- Wikidata
View/Edit Human	View/Edit Mouse

UPF0449 protein C19orf25 is a protein that in humans is encoded by the C19orf25 gene.

== Interactions ==
C19orf25 has been shown to interact with CCDC85B.
