= CCDC85B =

Protein-coding gene in humans

Identifiers
- Aliases: CCDC85B, DIPA, coiled-coil domain containing 85B
- External IDs: OMIM: 605360; MGI: 2147607; GeneCards: CCDC85B

Gene location (Human)
Chr.	Chromosome 11 (human)
Band	11q13.1	Start	65,890,673 bp
Band	11q13.1	End	65,891,635 bp

Gene location (Mouse)
Chr.	Chromosome 19 (mouse)
Band	19|19 A	Start	5,503,208 bp
Band	19|19 A	End	5,507,922 bp
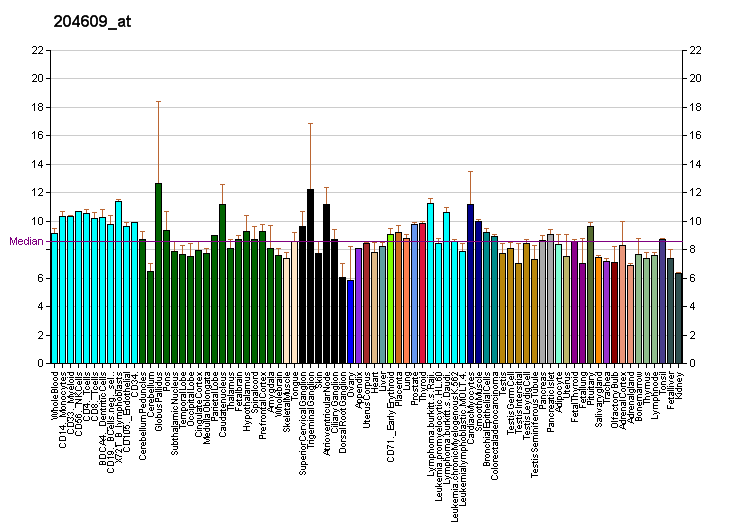

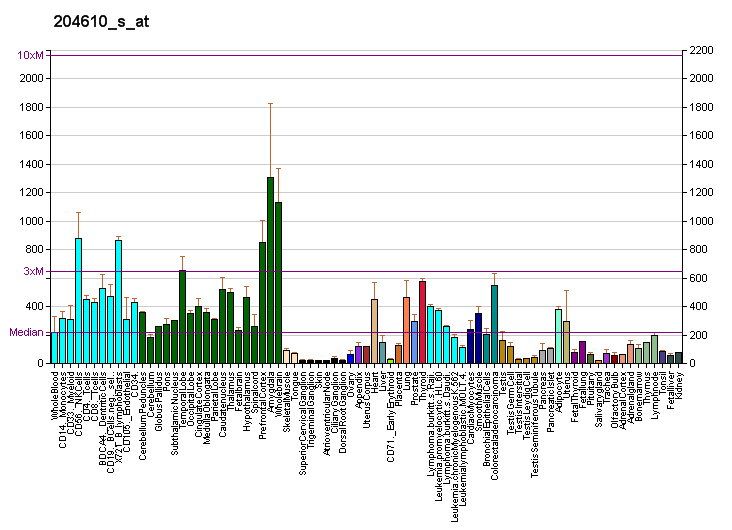
RNA expression pattern
Bgee	Human / Mouse (ortholog); Top expressed in: amygdala; Brodmann area 9; right frontal lobe; nucleus accumbens; putamen; apex of heart; caudate nucleus; Region I of hippocampus proper; cingulate gyrus; anterior cingulate cortex / Top expressed in: anterior horn of spinal cord; facial motor nucleus; endothelial cell of lymphatic vessel; epithelium of lens; otolith organ; utricle; prefrontal cortex; hippocampus proper; primary motor cortex; cingulate gyrus; More reference expression data
BioGPS	More reference expression data
Gene ontology
Molecular function	protein binding
Cellular component	cytoplasm; centrosome; cytoskeleton; nucleus; microtubule organizing center
Biological process	regulation of growth; cell differentiation; negative regulation of fat cell differentiation; negative regulation of transcription, DNA-templated; regulation of transcription, DNA-templated; negative regulation of cell growth; transcription, DNA-templated
Sources:Amigo / QuickGO
Orthologs
Databases	NCBI: entry; OMA: entry
Species	Human	Mouse
Entrez	11007	240514
Ensembl	ENSG00000175602	ENSMUSG00000095098
UniProt	Q15834	Q6PDY0
RefSeq (mRNA)	NM_006848	NM_001243307; NM_198616
RefSeq (protein)	NP_006839	NP_001230236; NP_941018
Location (UCSC)	Chr 11: 65.89 – 65.89 Mb	Chr 19: 5.5 – 5.51 Mb
PubMed search
- Wikidata
View/Edit Human	View/Edit Mouse

Coiled-coil domain-containing protein 85B is a protein that in humans is encoded by the CCDC85B gene.

== Function ==
Hepatitis delta virus (HDV) is a pathogenic human virus whose RNA genome and replication cycle resemble those of plant viroids. Delta-interacting protein A (DIPA), a cellular gene product, has been found to have homology to hepatitis delta virus antigen (HDAg). DIPA interacts with the viral antigen, HDAg, and can affect HDV replication in vitro.

== Interactions ==
CCDC85B has been shown to interact with:

- C19orf25,
- KANSL1,
- Keratin 17, and
- Protein kinase N1.
