= Keratin 6B =

Protein found in humans

KRT6B

Identifiers
- Aliases: KRT6B, CK-6B, CK6B, K6B, KRTL1, PC2, PC4, keratin 6B
- External IDs: OMIM: 148042; MGI: 1333768; GeneCards: KRT6B

Gene location (Human)
| Chr. | Chromosome 12 (human) |
| Band | 12q13.13 | Start | 52,446,651 bp |
| Band | 12q13.13 | End | 52,452,146 bp |

Gene location (Mouse)
| Chr. | Chromosome 15 (mouse) |
| Band | 15 F2|15 56.97 cM | Start | 101,584,458 bp |
| Band | 15 F2|15 56.97 cM | End | 101,588,722 bp |
RNA expression pattern
| Bgee | Human / Mouse (ortholog); Top expressed in: gums; gingival epithelium; hair follicle; skin of thigh; skin of arm; vulva; oral cavity; body of tongue; mucosa of pharynx; nipple / Top expressed in: conjunctival fornix; ciliary body; corneal stroma; cervix; retinal pigment epithelium; epithelium of lens; lip; umbilical cord; iris; sexually immature organism; More reference expression data |
| BioGPS | n/a |
Gene ontology
| Molecular function | structural constituent of cytoskeleton; protein binding; structural molecule activity |
| Cellular component | keratin filament; extracellular exosome; intermediate filament; cytosol |
| Biological process | ectoderm development; cytoskeleton organization; keratinization; cornification |
Sources:Amigo / QuickGO
Orthologs
| Databases | NCBI: entry; OMA: entry |
| Species | Human | Mouse |
| Entrez | 3854 | 16688 |
| Ensembl | ENSG00000185479 | ENSMUSG00000023041 |
| UniProt | P04259 | Q9Z331; Q3UV11 |
| RefSeq (mRNA) | NM_005555 | NM_010669 |
| RefSeq (protein) | NP_005546 | NP_034799 |
| Location (UCSC) | Chr 12: 52.45 – 52.45 Mb | Chr 15: 101.58 – 101.59 Mb |
| PubMed search |
- Wikidata
| View/Edit Human | View/Edit Mouse |

keratin 6B

Identifiers
- Symbol: KRT6B
- NCBI gene: 3854
- HGNC: 6444
- OMIM: 148042
- RefSeq: NM_005555
- UniProt: P04259

Other data
- Locus: Chr. 12 q12-q21
Search for
- Structures: Swiss-model
- Domains: InterPro

Keratin 6B is a type II cytokeratin, one of a number of isoforms of keratin 6. It is found with keratin 16 and/or keratin 17 in the hair follicles, the filiform papillae of the tongue and the epithelial lining of oral mucosa and esophagus. This keratin 6 isoform is thought be less abundant than the closely related keratin 6A protein. Mutations in the gene encoding this protein have been associated with pachyonychia congenita, an inherited disorder of the epithelial tissues in which this keratin is expressed, particularly leading to structural abnormalities of the nails, the epidermis of the palms and soles, and oral epithelia. Keratin 6B is associated with the PC-K6B subtype of pachyonychia congenita.
