= Keratin 6A =

Protein found in humans

KRT6A

Identifiers
- Aliases: KRT6A, CK6A, CK6C, CK6D, K6A, K6C, K6D, KRT6C, KRT6D, PC3, CK-6C, CK-6E, keratin 6A
- External IDs: OMIM: 148041; MGI: 1333768; GeneCards: KRT6A

Gene location (Human)
Chr.	Chromosome 12 (human)
Band	12q13.13	Start	52,487,176 bp
Band	12q13.13	End	52,493,257 bp

Gene location (Mouse)
Chr.	Chromosome 15 (mouse)
Band	15 F2|15 56.97 cM	Start	101,584,458 bp
Band	15 F2|15 56.97 cM	End	101,588,722 bp
RNA expression pattern
Bgee	Human / Mouse (ortholog); Top expressed in: gingival epithelium; amniotic fluid; hair follicle; vulva; body of tongue; oral cavity; mucosa of pharynx; human penis; skin of arm; skin of thigh / Top expressed in: conjunctival fornix; ciliary body; corneal stroma; cervix; retinal pigment epithelium; epithelium of lens; lip; umbilical cord; iris; sexually immature organism; More reference expression data
BioGPS	n/a
Gene ontology
Molecular function	structural constituent of cytoskeleton; protein binding; structural molecule activity
Cellular component	keratin filament; extracellular exosome; intermediate filament; membrane; nucleus; cytosol
Biological process	morphogenesis of an epithelium; cell differentiation; wound healing; positive regulation of cell population proliferation; cytoskeleton organization; keratinization; cornification; negative regulation of cytolysis by symbiont of host cells; negative regulation of entry of bacterium into host cell
Sources:Amigo / QuickGO
Orthologs
Databases	NCBI: entry; OMA: entry
Species	Human	Mouse
Entrez	3853	16688
Ensembl	ENSG00000205420	ENSMUSG00000023041
UniProt	P02538	Q9Z331; Q3UV11
RefSeq (mRNA)	NM_005554	NM_010669
RefSeq (protein)	NP_005545	NP_034799
Location (UCSC)	Chr 12: 52.49 – 52.49 Mb	Chr 15: 101.58 – 101.59 Mb
PubMed search
- Wikidata
View/Edit Human	View/Edit Mouse

Keratin 6A is one of the 27 different type II keratins expressed in humans. Keratin 6A was the first type II keratin sequence determined. Analysis of the sequence of this keratin together with that of the first type I keratin led to the discovery of the four helical domains in the central rod of keratins. In humans Keratin 6A is encoded by the KRT6A gene.

== Keratin family ==
Keratins are the intermediate filament proteins that form a dense meshwork of filaments throughout the cytoplasm of epithelial cells. Keratins form heteropolymers consisting of a type I and a type II keratin. Keratins are generally expressed in particular pairs of type I and type II keratin proteins in a tissue-specific and cellular differentiation-specific manner.

The keratin proteins of epithelial tissues are commonly known as "keratins" or are sometimes referred to as "epithelial keratins" or "cytokeratins". The specialized keratins of hair and nail are known as "hard keratins" or "trichocyte keratins". Trichocytes are the specialized epithelial cells from which hair and nail are composed. Trichocyte keratins are similar in their gene and protein structure to keratins except that they are especially rich in the sulfur-containing amino acid cysteine, which facilitates chemical cross-linking of the assembled hard keratins to form a more structurally resilient material.

Both epithelial keratins and hard keratins can be further subdivided into type I (acidic) keratins and type II (neutral-basic) keratins. The genes for the type I keratins are located in a gene cluster on human chromosome 17q, whereas the genes for type II keratins are located in a cluster on human chromosome 12q (the exception being K18, a type I keratin located in the type II gene cluster).

== Gene ==
The KRT6A gene consists of 9 exons separated by 8 introns and is located in the type II keratin gene cluster on human chromosome 12q. Keratin 6B and keratin 6C are encoded by the neighbouring genes, which are identical in intron-exon organization to KRT6A and are more than 99% identical in their DNA coding sequences.

== Tissue distribution ==
It is found with keratin 16 and/or keratin 17 in the palm and sole epidermis, the epithelial cells of the nail bed, the filiform papillae of the tongue, the epithelial lining of oral mucosa and esophagus, as well as the hair follicles.

== Clinical significance ==
=== Antimicrobial ===
Keratin 6A has been shown to have antimicrobial properties, and is the main antimicrobial factor in the eye.

=== Genetic disorders ===
Mutations in the genes expressing this protein is associated with the PC-K6A subtype of pachyonychia congenita, an inherited disorder of the epithelial tissues in which keratin 6A is expressed, particularly leading to structural abnormalities of the nails, the epidermis of the palms and soles, and oral epithelia.

== Immunohistochemistry ==
The expression of keratin 6A is often tested together with keratin 5, using CK5/6 antibodies, which target both keratin forms.
