= Unilateral palmoplantar verrucous nevus =

- Specialty: Dermatology

A Unilateral palmoplantar verrucous nevus is a cutaneous condition that has features of pachyonychia congenita.

== See also ==
- Unilateral nevoid telangiectasia
- List of cutaneous conditions
