= Neonatal teeth =

- Other names: Natal teeth
- Specialty: Dentistry

Natal teeth are teeth that are present above the gumline (have already erupted) at birth, and neonatal teeth are teeth that emerge through the gingiva during the first month of life (the neonatal period).

The incidence of neonatal teeth varies considerably, between 1:700 and 1:30,000 depending on the type of study; the highest prevalence is found in the only study that relies on personal examination of patients.

Natal teeth, and neonatal teeth, can be the baby's normal deciduous teeth, sprouting prematurely. These should be preserved, if possible. Alternately, they could be supernumerary teeth, extra teeth, not part of the normal allotment of teeth.

== Signs and symptoms ==
Most often natal teeth are mandibular central incisors. They have little root structure and are attached to the end of the gum by soft tissue and are often mobile.

== Causes ==
Most of the time, natal teeth are not related to a medical condition. However, sometimes they may be associated with:

- Ellis–van Creveld syndrome
- Hallermann–Streiff syndrome
- Pierre Robin syndrome
- Sotos syndrome

== Treatment ==
No intervention is usually recommended unless they are causing difficulty to the infant or mother.

However some recommend that they be removed as the tooth can cut or amputate the tip of the tongue.

They should be left in the mouth as long as possible to decrease the likelihood of removing permanent tooth buds with the natal tooth. They should also not be removed if the infant has hypoprothrombinemia. In case of complications when the natal teeth need to be removed, dental radiographs should be obtained whenever possible, and evaluated and followed up with pediatric dentists.

== Society and culture ==
=== Notable cases ===
- Napoleon Bonaparte
- Louis XIV
- Richard III
- Ivan the Terrible
- Kate Mulgrew
- Honoré Gabriel Riqueti, comte de Mirabeau
- Cardinal Mazarin
- Cardinal Richelieu
- Zoroaster
- Hannibal
- Manius Curius Dentatus (purportedly this was the meaning of his surname)
