= Histochemistry and Cell Biology =

- Discipline: Cell biology, histochemistry
- Language: English
- Edited by: Jürgen Roth, Takehiko Koji, Michael Schrader, Douglas J. Taatjes

Publication details
- Former names: Histochemie, Histochemistry
- History: 1958-present
- Publisher: Springer Science+Business Media on behalf of the Society for Histochemistry
- Frequency: Monthly
- Open access: Hybrid
- Impact factor: 4.304 (2020)

Standard abbreviations
- ISO 4: Histochem. Cell Biol.

Indexing
- CODEN: HCBIFP
- ISSN: 0948-6143 (print); 1432-119X (web)
- LCCN: 95648296
- OCLC no.: 32074894

Links
- Journal homepage; Online access

Histochemistry and Cell Biology is a peer-reviewed scientific journal in the field of molecular histology and cell biology, publishing original articles dealing with the localization and identification of molecular components, metabolic activities, and cell biological aspects of cells and tissues. The journal covers the development, application, and evaluation of methods and probes that can be used in the entire area of histochemistry and cell biology. The journal is published by Springer Science+Business Media and the official journal of the Society for Histochemistry. Earlier names of the journal are Histochemie and Histochemistry. The editors-in-chief are Jürgen Roth (University of Zurich), Takehiko Koji (University of Nagasaki), Michael Schrader (University of Exeter) and Douglas J. Taatjes (University of Vermont).
