= Unilateral nevoid telangiectasia =

- Specialty: Dermatology

Unilateral nevoid telangiectasia presents with fine thread veins, typically over a segment of skin supplied by a particular nerve on one side of the body. It most frequently involves the trigeminal, C3 and C4, or nearby areas. The condition was named in 1970 by Victor Selmanowitz.

== Signs and symptoms ==
Unilateral nevoid telangiectasia is characterized by multiple chronic asymptomatic superficial blanching telangiectasias along dermatomes or Blaschko's lines, with asymmetric skin involvement, while symmetric instances have been infrequently recorded. The trunk and upper extremities' third and fourth cervical dermatomes are the most severely impacted.

== Causes ==
Unilateral nevoid telangiectasia can be congenital or acquired. Rare congenital type manifests at or soon after the neonatal period; it is more common in males and occurs in an autosomal dominant pattern. Conversely, the acquired form is nearly exclusively found in young female patients who have physiologic problems.

== Diagnosis ==
A normal-appearing epidermis with superficial dermal telangiectatic blood vessels beneath and a low level of inflammatory infiltration is revealed by histopathologic investigation.

== Treatment ==
After the triggering factor is eliminated, unilateral nevoid telangiectasia usually persists but in rare situations, it resolves on its own. The first step in treatment is cosmetic concealment. The condition has improved aesthetically with the use of pulsed dye laser, which has proven to be a useful alternative.

== See also ==
- Skin lesion
- List of cutaneous conditions
