= Microcalcification =

Calcium deposits in the breast

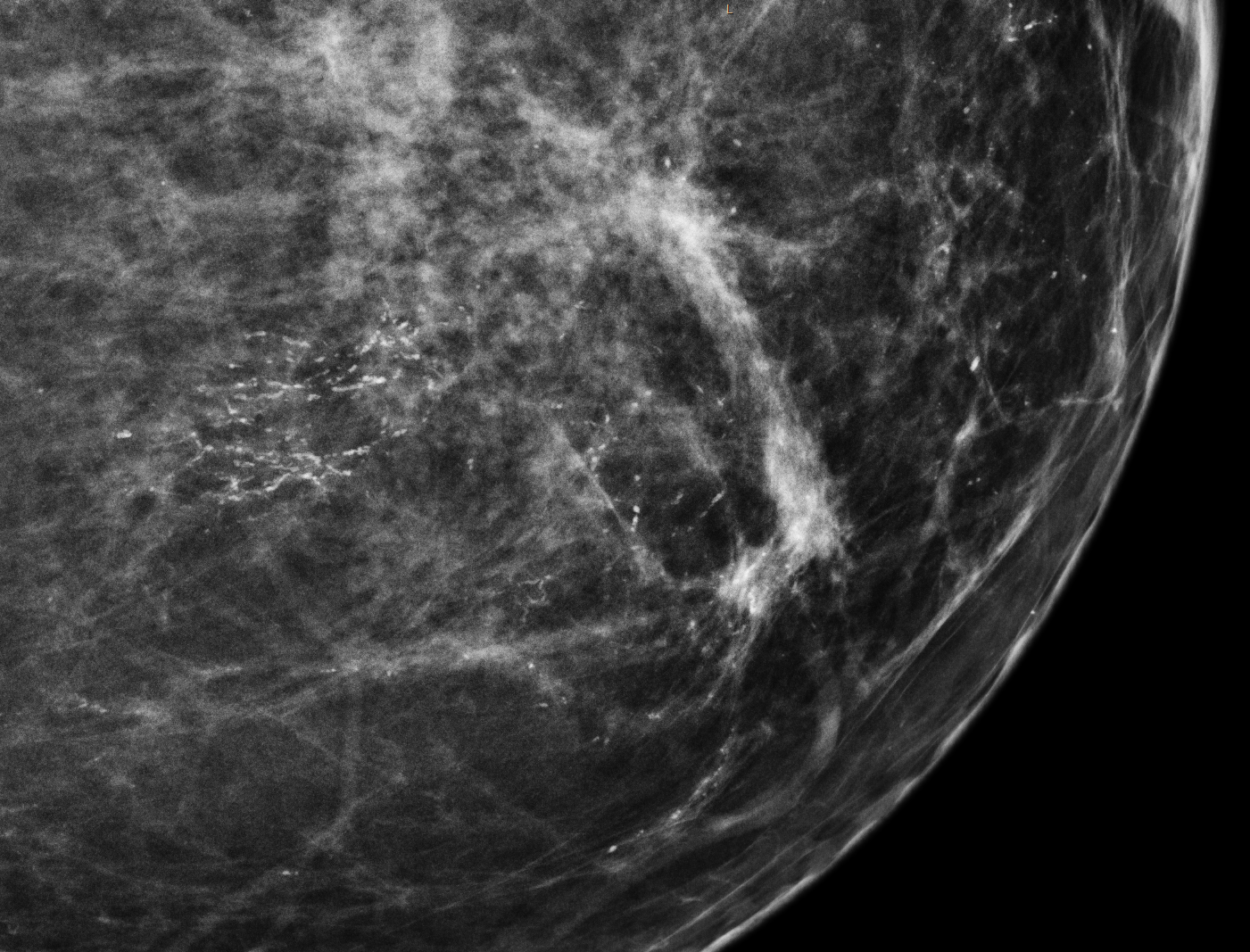
Mammogram microcalcifications in ductal carcinoma in situ

Microcalcifications are tiny deposits of calcium salts that are too small to be felt but can be detected by imaging.

They can be scattered throughout the mammary gland, or occur in clusters. Microcalcifications can be an early sign of breast cancer. Based on morphology, it is possible to classify by radiography how likely microcalcifications are to indicate cancer.

== In breast ==
Microcalcifications in the breast are made up of calcium phosphate or calcium oxalate. When consisting of calcium phosphate, they are usually dystrophic calcifications (occurring in degenerated or necrotic tissue). Yet, the mechanism of their formation is not fully known.

Calcium oxalate crystals in the breast may be seen on mammography and are usually benign, but can be associated with lobular carcinoma in situ.

Microcalcification was first described in 1913 by surgeon Albert Salomon.

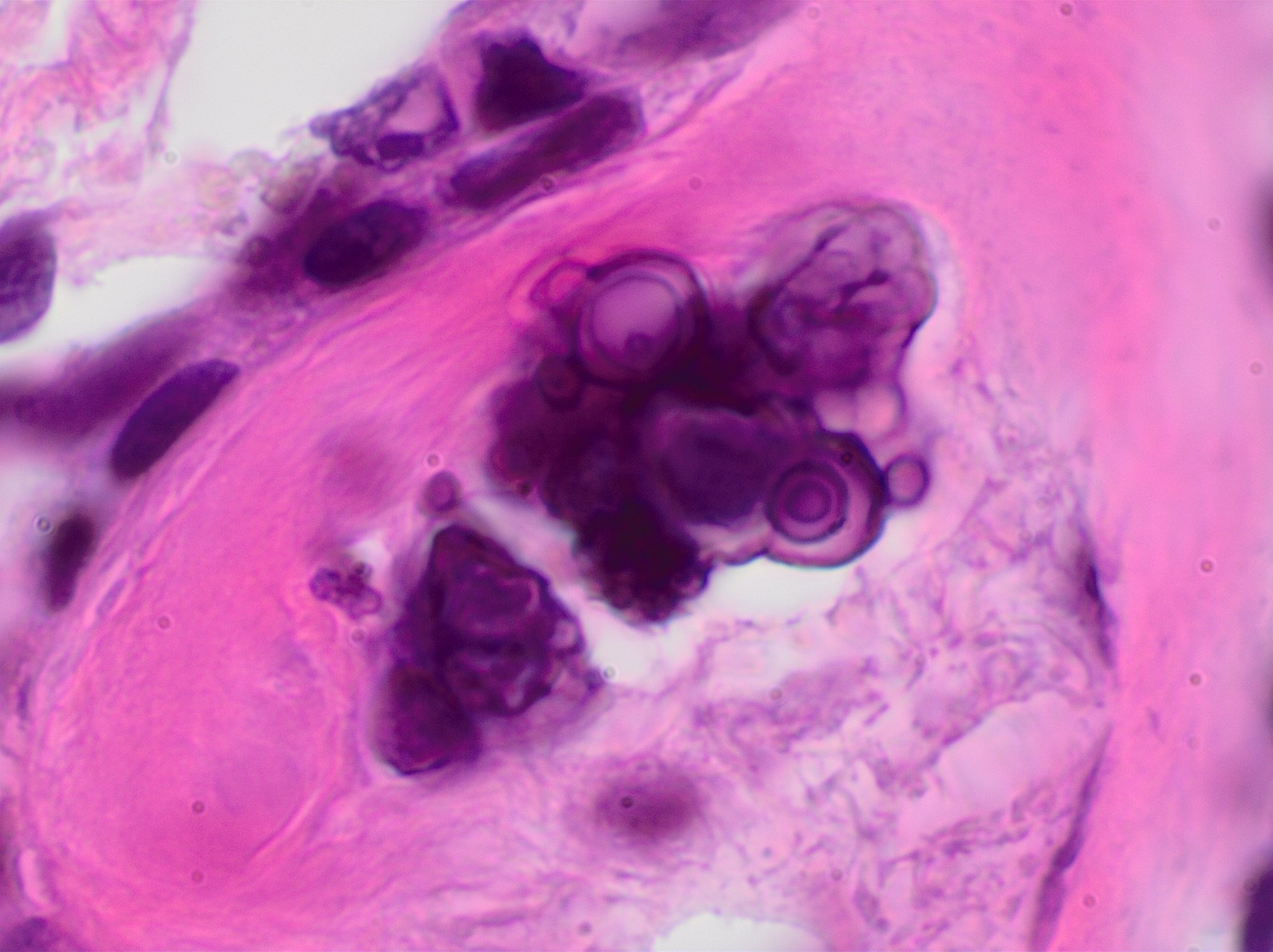
Calcium phosphate microcalcifications in non-neoplastic breast tissue.

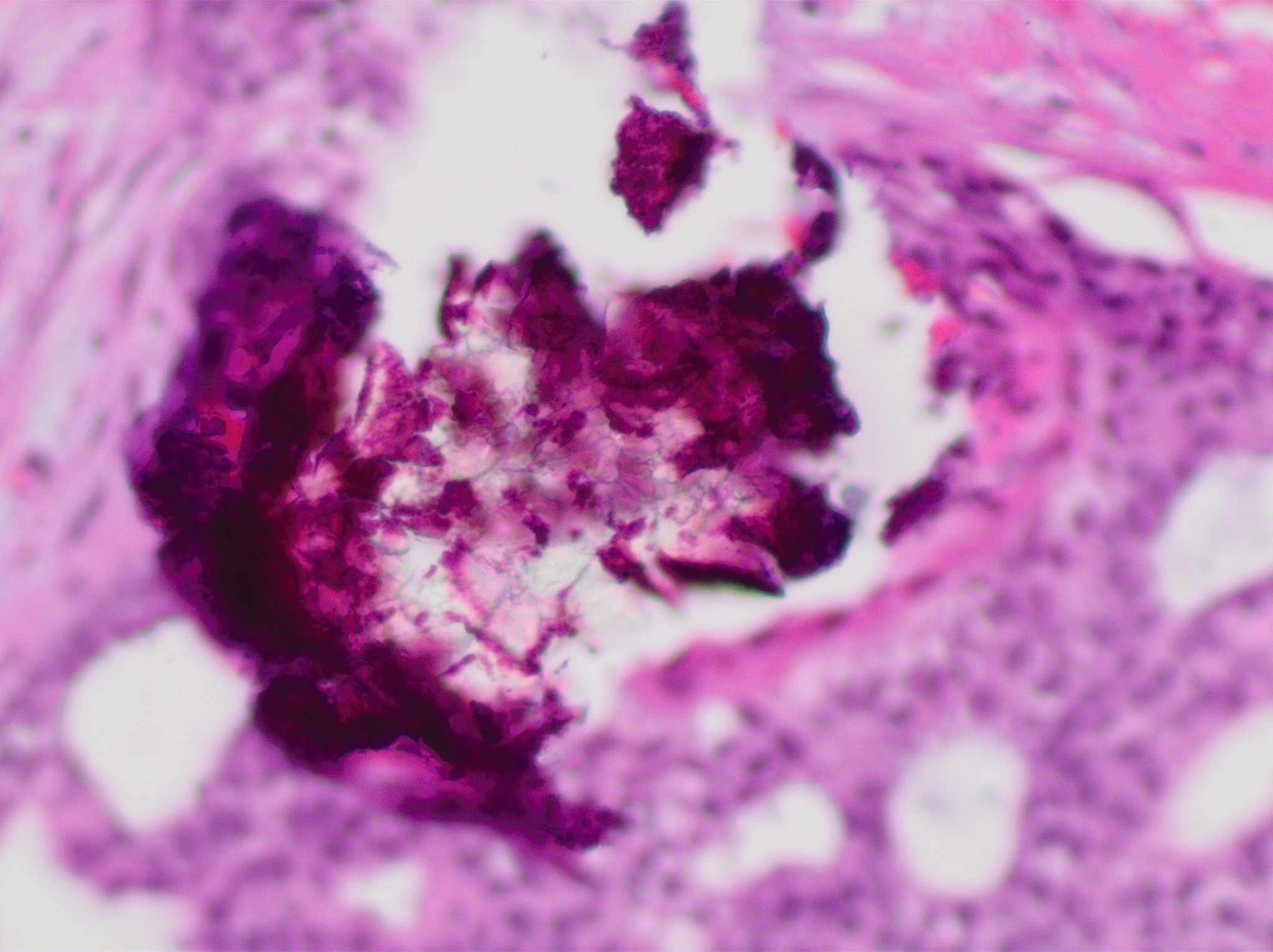
Histopathology of dystrophic calcium phosphate microcalcifications in ductal carcinoma in situ (DCIS) of the breast, H&E stain.

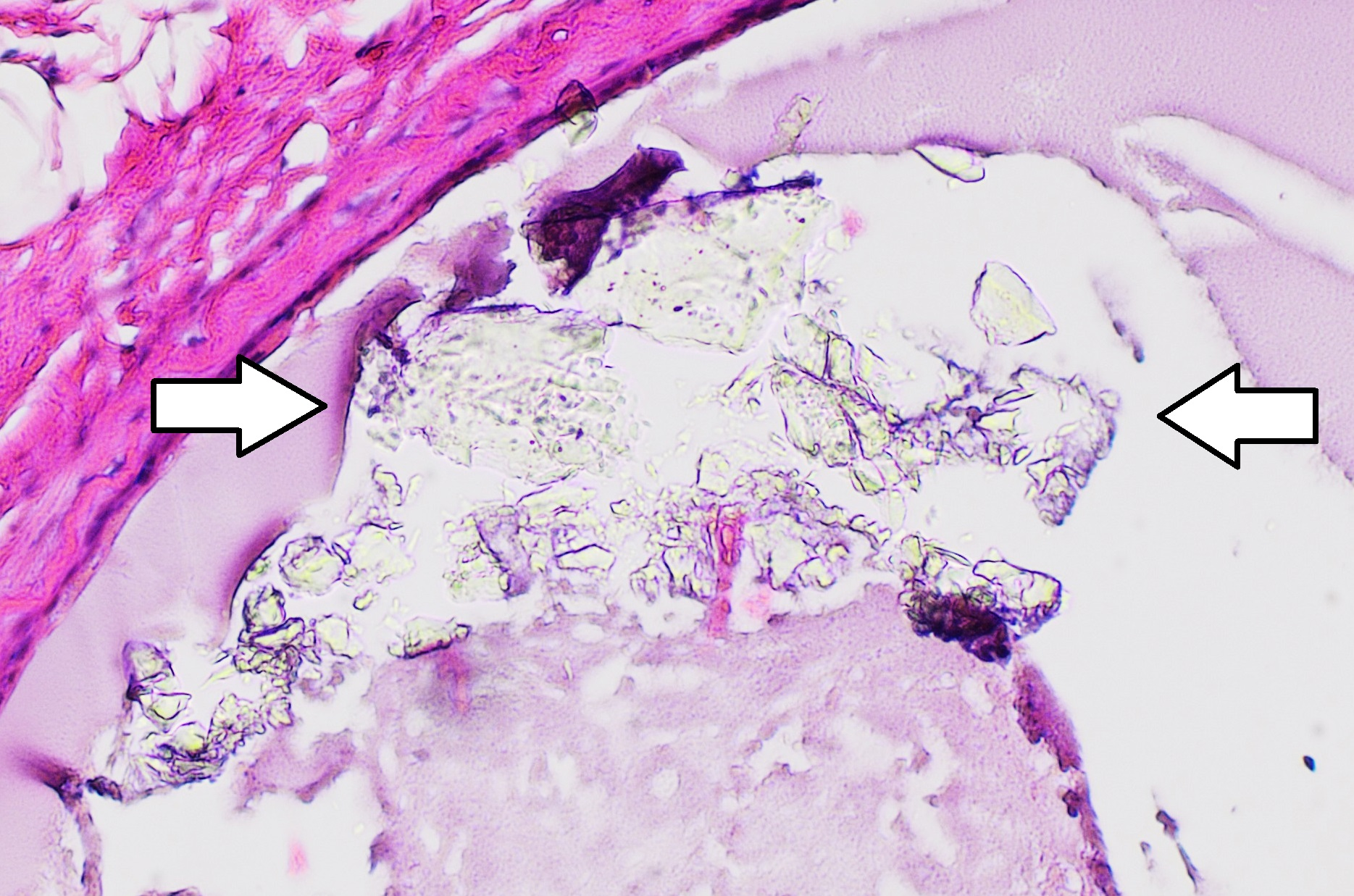
Histopathology of calcium oxalate crystals in a benign breast cyst, H&E stain.

In contrast to an artifact of crowded cells, the DCIS calcification pictured above characteristically extends outside the focal plane, as the background DCIS is blurred in this focus.
