= Keratin 17 =

Protein found in humans

KRT17

Identifiers
- Aliases: KRT17, K17, PC, PC2, PCHC1, 39.1, CK-17, keratin 17
- External IDs: OMIM: 148069; MGI: 96691; GeneCards: KRT17

Gene location (Human)
Chr.	Chromosome 17 (human)
Band	17q21.2	Start	41,619,442 bp
Band	17q21.2	End	41,624,842 bp

Gene location (Mouse)
Chr.	Chromosome 11 (mouse)
Band	11 D|11 63.44 cM	Start	100,147,043 bp
Band	11 D|11 63.44 cM	End	100,151,855 bp
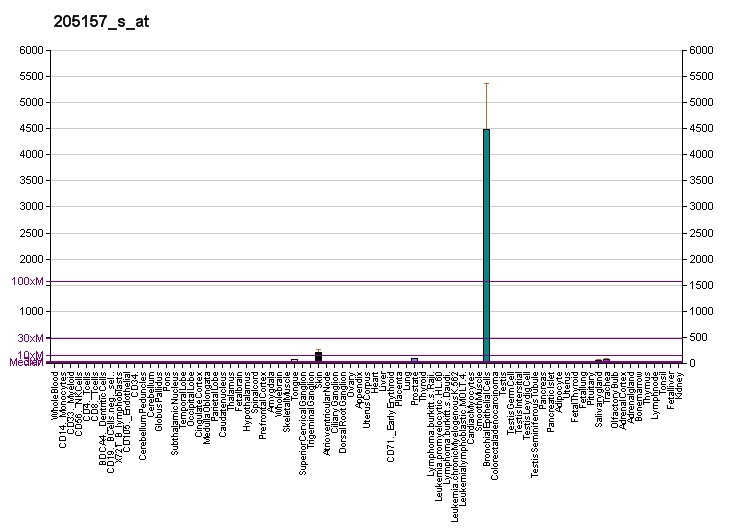

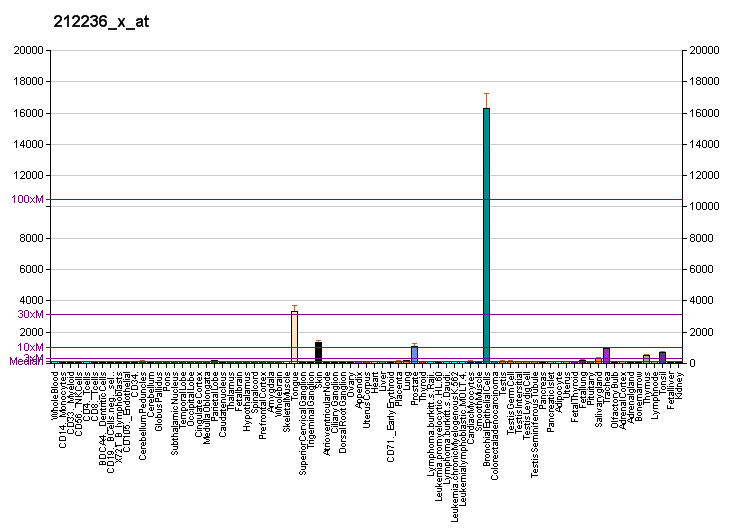
RNA expression pattern
Bgee	Human / Mouse (ortholog); Top expressed in: gingival epithelium; olfactory zone of nasal mucosa; amniotic fluid; vulva; skin of thigh; hair follicle; skin of arm; skin of abdomen; nipple; buccal mucosa cell / Top expressed in: lip; molar; skin of back; epidermis; hair follicle; skin of external ear; skin of abdomen; thymus; corneal stroma; hair; More reference expression data
BioGPS	More reference expression data
Gene ontology
Molecular function	structural constituent of cytoskeleton; MHC class II receptor activity; protein binding; structural molecule activity; MHC class II protein binding
Cellular component	cytoplasm; extracellular exosome; intermediate filament; cell periphery; cytosol; intermediate filament cytoskeleton
Biological process	morphogenesis of an epithelium; positive regulation of hair follicle development; hair follicle morphogenesis; intermediate filament organization; positive regulation of cell growth; positive regulation of translation; signal transduction; epidermis development; keratinization; cornification; cytoskeleton organization
Sources:Amigo / QuickGO
Orthologs
Databases	NCBI: entry; OMA: entry
Species	Human	Mouse
Entrez	3872	16667
Ensembl	ENSG00000128422	ENSMUSG00000035557
UniProt	Q04695	Q9QWL7
RefSeq (mRNA)	NM_000422	NM_010663
RefSeq (protein)	NP_000413	NP_034793
Location (UCSC)	Chr 17: 41.62 – 41.62 Mb	Chr 11: 100.15 – 100.15 Mb
PubMed search
- Wikidata
View/Edit Human	View/Edit Mouse

Keratin, type I cytoskeletal 17 is a protein that in humans is encoded by the KRT17 gene.

Keratin 17 is a type I cytokeratin. It is found in nail beds, hair follicles, sebaceous glands, and other epidermal appendages. Mutations in the gene encoding this protein lead to PC-K17 (previously known as Jackson-Lawler) type pachyonychia congenita and steatocystoma multiplex.

== Interactions ==
Keratin 17 has been shown to interact with CCDC85B.
