= Breast cancer treatment =

Overview of current and historical management methods of breast cancer

Breast cancer treatment takes different approaches depending on the physical and biological characteristics of the disease, as well as the age, overall health, and personal preferences of the patient. Treatment types can be classified into local therapy (surgery and radiation therapy) and systemic treatment (chemotherapy, hormonal therapy, targeted therapy, and immunotherapy). Local therapy is most efficacious in early stage breast cancer, while systemic therapy is generally used in advanced and metastatic disease, or in diseases with specific phenotypes.

Historically, breast cancer was treated with radical surgery alone. Modern treatment often consists of breast-conserving surgery, along with some combination of chemotherapy, radiation therapy, hormonal therapy, targeted therapy, and immunotherapy. Management of breast cancer is undertaken by a multidisciplinary team, including medical, radiation, and surgical oncologists, and is guided by national and international guidelines.

== Classification ==
The classification of breast cancer involves determining certain characteristics of the cancer cells, such as their type and grade, the presence or absence of hormone and HER2 receptors, and some measure of their rate of proliferation.

=== Cell type ===
From a histopathological perspective, 15-30% of breast cancers are carcinoma in situ (CIS), while the other 70-85% are invasive carcinoma. Of those breast cancers that are classified as invasive, about 80% are ductal, 10% are lobular, 6% are cribriform, 2% are mucinous, 2% are medullary, 1% are papillary, and <1% are metaplastic.

=== Cell grade ===
In most cases, breast cancers are graded by adding up scores for tubule formation, nuclear pleomorphism, and mitotic count, each of which is given 1 to 3 points. The scores for each of these three criteria are then added together to give an overall score and a corresponding grade as follows:

- 3-5 Grade 1 tumor (well-differentiated).
- 6-7 Grade 2 tumor (moderately differentiated).
- 8-9 Grade 3 tumor (poorly differentiated).

=== Hormone receptor and HER2 status ===
For the purpose of predicting the response to treatment, breast cancer can be classified into four major subtypes, based on the presence or absence of certain receptors on the cells of the tumor. In order of prevalence, these are:

- HR+/HER2-: 70%
- HR-/HER2-: 11%
- HR+/HER2+: 9%
- HR-/HER2+: 4%
- Unknown subtype: 6%

HR refers to hormone receptor (estrogen or progesterone), and +/- indicates its presence or absence. HER2 +/- refers to presence or absence of the HER2 receptor.

HR+/HER2- (also known as luminal A breast cancer) is a slow-growing subtype, while HR+/HER2+ (also known as luminal B breast cancer) is a faster-growing subtype. HR-/HER2- (also known as triple-negative breast cancer) is negative for all three major receptor types. People with the HR+/HER2- subtype exhibit the highest five-year survival, followed by the HR+/HER2+ subtype and the HR-/HER2+ subtype. The HR-/HER2- subtype has the lowest five-year survival.

=== Proliferative index ===
Determining the proliferative index of cancer cells is an important step in establishing the diagnosis and predicting the prognosis of breast cancers, as well as for the selection of treatment protocols.

One commonly employed method for determining the proliferative index is the mitotic index, which is defined as the percentage of cells undergoing mitosis within a given population of cells.

Measurement of the S-phase fraction (SPF) by flow cytometry is another method of evaluating cell proliferation. An assessment of how many cells are actively synthesizing DNA, the SPF is an important predictor of relapse-free survival in people with breast cancer.

== Staging ==
Staging of breast cancer is an important step to help physicians determine the most appropriate course of treatment. The TNM staging system, in combination with histopathology, grade and genomic profiling, is used for prognosis and for determining whether additional treatment is warranted. The TNM stage of a cancer is a measurement of the physical extent of the tumor and its spread, where:

- T stands for the main (primary) tumor (range of T0-T4)
- N stands for spread to nearby lymph nodes (range of N0-N3)
- M stands for metastasis (spread to distant parts of the body; either M0 or M1)

The TNM information is then combined to give the cancer an overall stage. Non-invasive cancer is listed as stage 0, while invasive cancers are expressed from stage I (the least advanced stage) to stage IV (the most advanced stage, in which the cancer has spread beyond the breast and the lymph nodes).

== Surgery ==
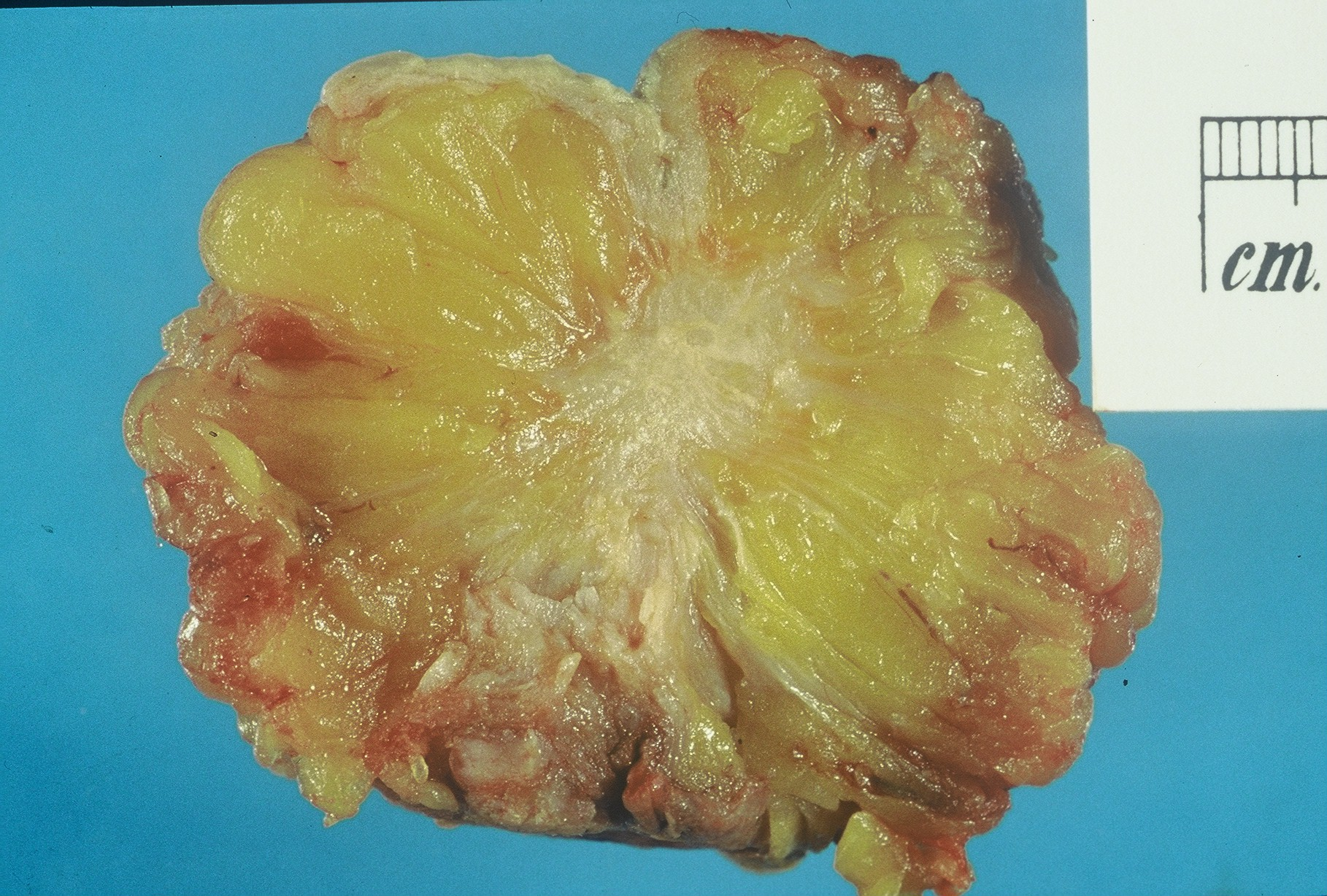
Excised breast tissue showing a stellate, pale area of cancer measuring 2 cm across. The tumor could be felt as a hard, mobile lump before the surgical excision.

=== Resection ===
Surgery is the primary management for breast cancer. A needle-localized biopsy of the tumor is often performed before surgery. Depending on the classification and staging of the tumor, surgery may consist of a radical mastectomy, a modified radical mastectomy, or a lumpectomy (removal of the lump only). If the tissue removed in the operation has resection margins free of cancer, this is an indication that the cancer has been completely excised. If this is not the case, then additional surgery may be necessary.

Mastectomy may be the preferred treatment in certain instances. For example:

- two or more tumors exist in the breast (a multifocal cancer);
- inflammatory breast cancer;
- previous history of radiation therapy to the chest;
- the tumor is large relative to the size of the breast;
- people who have undergone previous breast-conserving surgery that did not remove all the cancer cells;
- people at high risk of a second breast cancer because of a genetic mutation or strong family history;
- people who are unable or unwilling to undergo radiation therapy.

Removal of axillary lymph nodes is often included as part of breast tumor removal. Treatment with a full axillary lymph node dissection carries an increased risk of lymphedema, pain, reduced arm movement and numbness, while having no axillary lymph nodes removed carries an increased risk of recurrence of cancer. Treatment with less invasive axillary surgery (such as axillary sampling or sentinel lymph node biopsy) appears to be equally efficacious when compared with axillary lymph node dissection.

=== Breast reconstruction ===
Cosmetic deformity causes distress and contributes to postoperative depression in many people after resection of breast cancer. To help alleviate these problems, breast reconstruction surgery with autologous tissue or prosthetic breast implants is often included in holistic approaches to cancer management. Reconstruction can take place at the same time as cancer-removing surgery, or months to years later. Some women decide not to have reconstruction or opt for a prosthesis instead.

=== Prophylactic surgery ===
Some people who have a high risk of developing breast cancer may choose to have risk-reducing surgery before a cancer appears. This may include bilateral mastectomy, removal of the ovaries, or both. Examples of such people include:

- people who test positive for BRCA1 or BRCA2 mutations;
- people who have pleomorphic lobular carcinoma in situ (PLCIS) plus a strong family history of breast cancer;
- people who have had radiation therapy to the chest (including the breasts) before age 30 years.

== Radiation therapy ==
Radiation therapy is an adjuvant therapy used in many people who have undergone surgical treatment for breast cancer. It involves the use of ionizing radiation to target a tumor or post-surgery tumor site. It reduces the likelihood that the cancer will recur within the breast, chest wall, or axilla. Radiation therapy can cause collateral damage to normal tissue around where the tumor was. Healthy tissue can repair itself, while cancer cells do not repair themselves as well as normal cells.

Radiation therapy is not often used in patients with metastatic disease, except for palliation of symptoms like bone pain. It is typically used:

- As part of breast-conserving therapy.
- After mastectomy for patients with higher risk of recurrence because of conditions such as a large primary tumor or substantial involvement of the lymph nodes.
- If the tumor is close to or involving the margins on pathology specimen.
- Multiple areas of tumor (multicentric disease).
- Microscopic invasion of lymphatic or vascular tissues, or of the skin, nipple/areola, or underlying pectoralis major muscle.
- Patients with extension out of the substance of a lymph node.
- Inadequate numbers of axillary lymph nodes sampled.

=== Types of radiation therapy ===
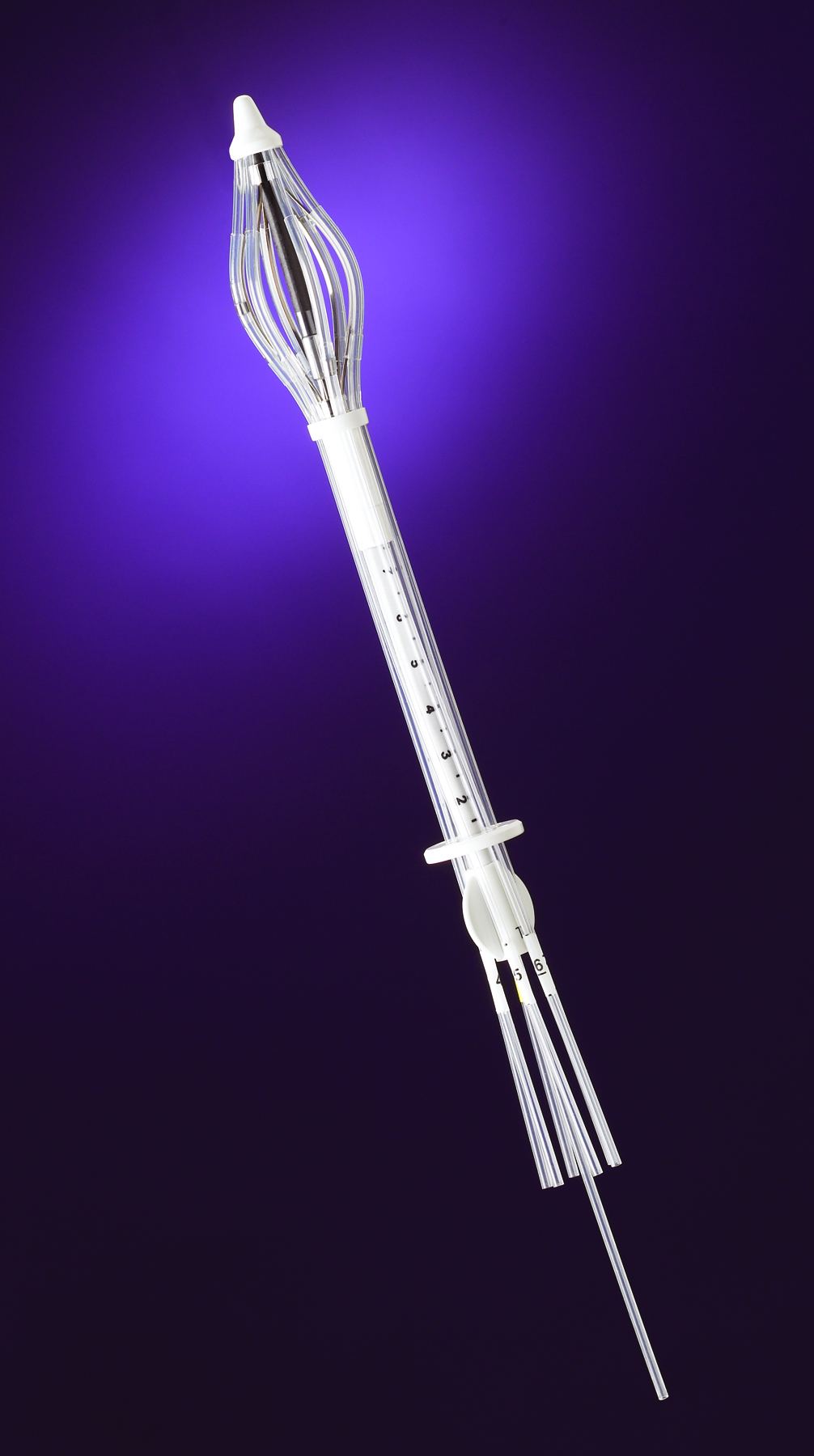
The SAVI applicator is a multiple catheter breast brachytherapy device

Radiation therapy can be delivered by external beam radiotherapy (EBRT) or by brachytherapy (internal radiotherapy).

In people who have undergone mastectomy, radiation is often delivered by EBRT. In EBRT, X-rays are generated and delivered by a machine called a linear particle accelerator. EBRT treatments for breast cancer are typically given five days a week for five to 10 weeks.

For people with early-stage breast cancer, radiation may be administered to only the breast, and in some cases they may be eligible for brachytherapy. Brachytherapy involves the precise placement of radiation source(s) inside the breast. These approaches may spare healthy tissue from unnecessary radiation.

A newer approach, called accelerated partial breast irradiation (APBI), involves the delivery of radiation to a smaller volume of breast tissue over a shorter period of time. ABPI appears to have fewer side effects, while achieving equivalent treatment results. APBI reduces the length of treatment to just five days, compared to the typical six or seven weeks for whole breast irradiation. APBI treatments can be given as brachytherapy or EBRT with a linear particle accelerator. These treatments are usually limited to people with well-defined tumors that have not spread.

== Systemic therapy ==
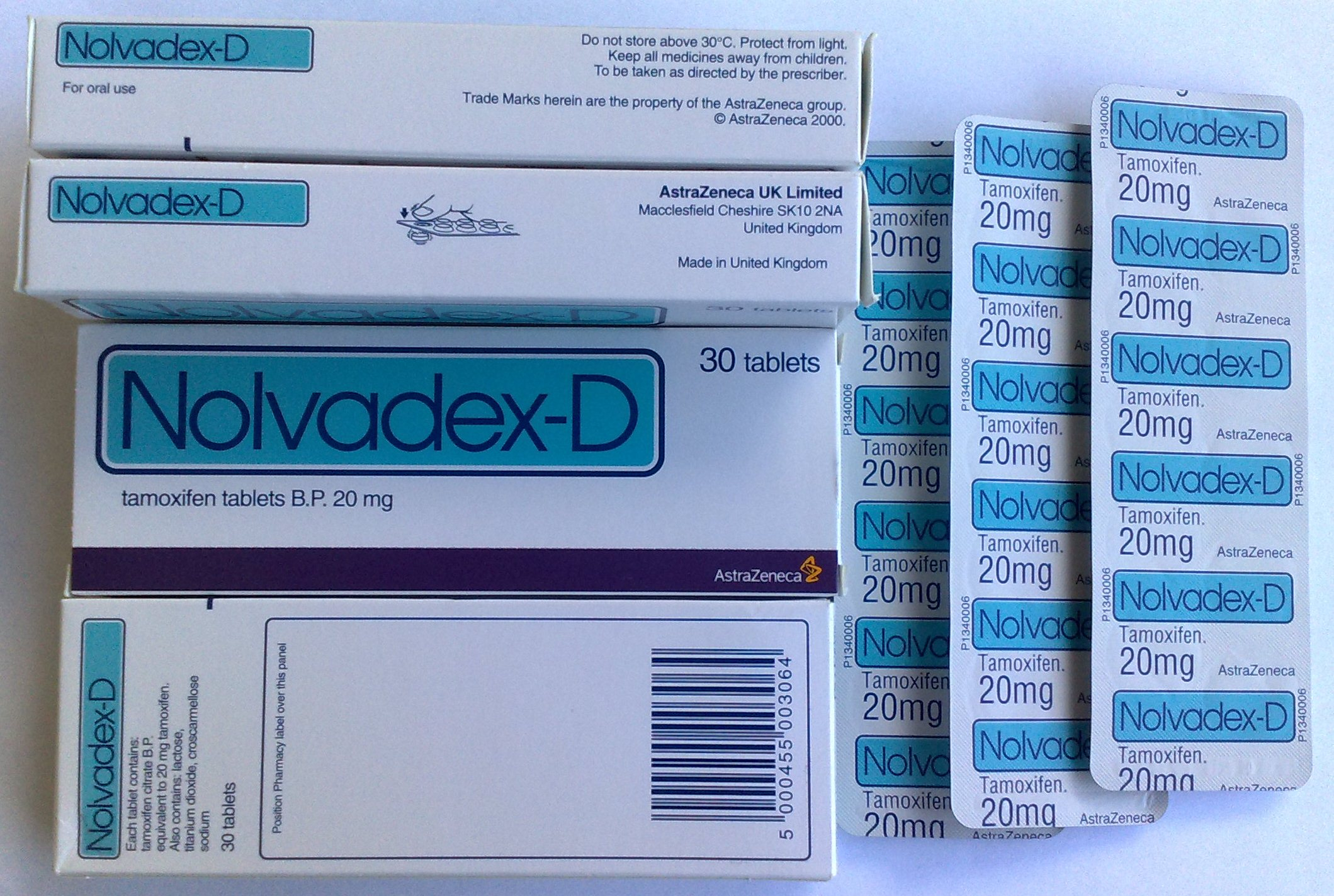
Nolvadex (tamoxifen), 20 mg tablets)

Systemic therapy for breast cancer uses medications to destroy cancer cells throughout the body. It consists of some combination of chemotherapy, hormonal therapy, targeted therapy, and immunotherapy. Systemic therapy may be used before surgery, after surgery, or instead of surgery for those cases in which surgery is considered unsuitable.

=== Chemotherapy ===
Chemotherapy is a useful modality in the treatment of breast cancer. It usually consists of the administration of some combination of antineoplastic agents according to a specific regimen. The antineoplastic agents destroy or disrupt the growth of cancer cells in order to reduce the risk that breast cancer will recur. Determining the appropriate chemotherapy regimen to use depends on factors such as the stage and classification of the tumor, and the age and health of the patient.

=== Hormonal therapy ===
Patients with estrogen or progesterone receptor-positive tumors are candidates for receiving hormonal therapy to slow the progression of tumors or to reduce the likelihood of recurrence. Hormonal treatments include administration of inhibitors of hormone synthesis (such as aromatase inhibitors and GnRH modulators), hormone receptor antagonists (such as SERMs, SERDs, and antiandrogens), and hormone supplementation.

=== Targeted therapy ===
In patients whose cancer expresses an over-abundance of the HER2 protein, certain monoclonal antibodies may be used to block the activity of the HER2 protein in breast cancer cells. For example, trastuzumab can impair the growth of cancer cells, as well as improve survival in people with breast cancer. Pertuzumab may work synergistically with trastuzumab on the expanded ErbB family of receptors. Neratinib may be useful in the adjuvant treatment of early stage HER2-positive breast cancer. PARP inhibitors may be useful in the metastatic setting, and are being investigated for use in the non-metastatic setting. Antibody–drug conjugates include trastuzumab emtansine, trastuzumab deruxtecan, and sacituzumab govitecan.

=== Immunotherapy ===
Immunotherapy can also be useful in the treatment of breast cancer. This modality harnesses the body's immune system to help fight cancer, or to treat deleterious side effects caused by antineoplastic agents. For example, granulocyte colony-stimulating factor can be administered to treat chemotherapy-induced loss of neutrophils.

Also, certain monoclonal antibodies can be used in combination with chemotherapy for people with metastatic or locally advanced triple-negative breast cancer. Examples include atezolizumab (a PD-L1 inhibitor) and pembrolizumab (a PD-1 inhibitor).

== Other treatment modalities ==
=== Cryoablation ===
Cryoablation is a minimally invasive percutaneous procedure that may be available to some people with breast cancer. This modality uses a cryoprobe to induce freeze and thaw cycles to treat small breast cancers or focal sites of metastatic disease in patients not eligible for surgery.

=== Focused ultrasound ===
High-intensity focused ultrasound (HIFU) is used for thermal ablation of solid tumors, while low-intensity focused ultrasound (LIFU) provides sonodynamic therapy (SDT). Ultrasound-assisted drug delivery systems (US-DDS) improve the delivery of chemotherapeutic agents and help to overcome biological barriers such as the blood–brain barrier.

== Treatment response assessment ==
=== Medical imaging ===
Medical imaging is frequently used to aid in diagnostic decisions in both the screening and treatment of breast cancer. Modalities used include mammography, magnetic resonance imaging, nuclear medicine, and medical ultrasound. Mammography is a diagnostic screening tool used to detect tumors in the breast. It can reveal suspicious masses, abnormal calcifications or other anomalies. Other imaging includes digital breast tomosynthesis (DBT) and contrast-enhanced digital mammography. Magnetic resonance imaging is a supplemental tool to mammography and ultrasound within the initial screening stages but is typically used in the management of patients with a formal diagnosis of breast cancer, to stage the disease before treatment and to assess the response to treatment. Medical ultrasound is commonly used for evaluating breast lesions, as well as for guiding biopsy needles to particular regions of interest in the breast. It can also be used to help differentiate cysts from solid tumors based on the size, echogenicity, and vascularity of the mass.

== Management of side effects ==
Systemic therapy and radiation therapy can cause unpleasant side effects such as nausea and vomiting, mouth sores, skin inflammation, insomnia, and menopausal symptoms.

Lifestyle adjustments are usually suggested first to manage hot flashes due to endocrine therapy. This can include avoiding triggers such as alcohol, tobacco, and caffeine. Depending on their frequency and severity, certain medications (e.g., SNRIs such as venlafaxine) can be effective in reducing these symptoms.

Some patients develop lymphedema as a result of axillary node dissection or of radiation treatment to the lymph nodes. Treatment consists of a combination of exercise, wearing of a compression sleeve, diet management, massage therapy, and prevention of skin infection.

Upper-limb dysfunction is a common side effect of breast cancer treatment. Shoulder range of motion can be impaired after surgery. Exercise can meaningfully improve shoulder range of motion in women with breast cancer. An exercise programme can be started early after surgery, if it does not negatively affect wound drainage.

Many people with cancer use alternative medicine practices to try to reduce these side effects. Complementary medicines that contain phytoestrogens are not recommended for breast cancer patients as they may stimulate estrogen receptor-positive tumours.

== See also ==
- Cultural differences in breast cancer diagnosis and treatment
