= Post-mastectomy pain syndrome =

- Other names: PMPS
- Symptoms: Burning, electric shock, or stabbing pain and/or neuropathic symptoms.
- Usual onset: After mastectomy.
- Causes: Direct nerve injury or formation of a traumatic neuroma or scar tissue.
- Risk factors: Severe acute postoperative pain, preoperative anxiety, age ≤49 years, and higher BMI.
- Diagnostic method: Characteristic symptoms following a breast cancer operation and/or local radiation therapy or chemotherapy.
- Differential diagnosis: Locoregional recurrent breast cancer, metastatic breast cancer, breast inflammation/infection, phantom breast pain or phantom sensations, chemical neuropathy, lymphedema, musculoskeletal disorders, and cervical radiculopathy.
- Prevention: Preventive analgesia, preservation of axillary nerves, and psychosocial intervention.
- Treatment: Medication, neuroma excision, axillary scar release, autologous fat grafting, interventional procedures, and physical therapy.
- Medication: Gabapentin, venlafaxine, duloxetine, amitriptyline, imipramine, nortriptyline, and doxepin.
- Frequency: 20-72% following breast cancer operation.

Post-mastectomy pain syndrome (PMPS) is used to describe persistent neuropathic pain that follows breast surgery, such as mastectomy and lumpectomy. PMPS manifests as pain in the arm, axilla, chest wall, and breast region.

PMPS can be caused by a direct nerve injury, indirect nerve injury, or by the development of scar tissue or a traumatic neuroma following breast cancer surgery. Risk factors for the development of PMPS include younger age, history of headaches, and quadrantectomy with axillary lymphadenectomy. While the exact mechanisms of PMPS aren't fully understood it is thought to be caused by neuralgia of the intercostobrachial nerve.

The diagnosis of PMPS is based on symptoms, exclusion of other possible causes of pain, and a history of mastectomy. Differential diagnosis of PMPS includes phantom breast pain, cervical radiculopathy, pectoralis minor syndrome/neurogenic thoracic outlet syndrome, scapulothoracic bursitis, glenohumeral joint adhesive capsulitis, shoulder impingement syndrome, myofascial pain, and lymphedema.

The risk of PMPS can be reduced by managing mental health concerns prior to surgery, performing sentinel lymph node biopsy over a more extensive axillary lymph node dissection, and properly controlling perioperative pain. Antidepressants such as amitriptyline and venlafaxine can be used to manage PMPS. Pregabalin and gabapentin are also considered first line treatment for PMPS. Topical capsaicin can be used to relieve nerve pain. Peripheral nerve blockade or neurolysis are used to treat peripheral nerve pain.

== Signs and symptoms ==
Post-mastectomy pain syndrome is a chronic neuropathic pain that usually manifests as continuous pain in the arm, axilla, chest wall, and breast region. Pain is most likely to start after surgery, although adjuvant therapy, such as chemotherapy or radiation therapy, may sometimes cause new symptoms to appear. PMPS pain has been described as searing, excruciating cold, or electric shock feelings, as well as numbness, tingling, or pins and needles. There may also be mechanical allodynia and hypoesthesia.

== Causes ==
The development of a traumatic neuroma or scar tissue after the breast cancer surgery, or direct nerve injury, such as transection, compression, ischemia, stretching, and retraction, might result in postmastectomy pain syndrome. On the other hand, indirect nerve injury can happen during or after surgery. Peripheral nerves may become compressed and stressed during surgery due to retraction and improper arm posture. Stretch and compression injuries following surgery can result from scarring, seroma, and hematoma. Nerve damage can then lead to a variety of sensory abnormalities, such as tingling, burning, or numbness.

=== Risk factors ===
The biggest risk factors for PMPS are age less than fifty, quadrantectomy with axillary lymphadenectomy, and headache. Other risk factors include prior surgery site pain, lower educational attainment, recurrent somatization, sleep disturbances, and axillary dissection.

The majority of scientific research indicates that a woman's risk of developing PMPS decreases with age. This could be explained by the fact that younger women with breast cancer had worse prognoses in terms of the tumor's aggressiveness and the possibility of a recurrence.

Regarding the kind of surgery, current research indicates that, regardless of the method used, axillary lymphadenectomy is the risk factor most significant for PMPS.

Lastly, it was discovered that patients with a history of headaches were more likely to acquire PMPS; this finding could be attributed to central sensitization. Frequent headaches are thought to cause a condition of central hypersensitivity, which is initially only functional but may become more permanent as a result of neural plasticity prolonging the pain process.

== Mechanism ==
Although the precise cause and mechanism of PMPS are unknown, multiple factors seem to be involved. Neuralgia of the intercostobrachial nerve is currently thought to be the most frequent cause of PMPS. The cutaneous lateral branch of T2, known as the intercostobrachial nerve, passes through the serratus anterior muscle and innervates the axillary region and upper arm. Numerous modes of injury during axillary dissection, including as stretching or compression during retraction and frank transection, are linked to damage to the intercostobrachial nerve. The dorsal root ganglion and nerve injury site are thought to be the sites of ectopic neuronal activity, which underlies the underlying pathology. This leads to heightened sensitivity to chemical or mechanical stimuli and consequent pain perceptions.

== Diagnosis ==
In the absence of an infection or recurrent disease, the diagnosis of postmastectomy pain syndrome is based on the characteristic symptoms of burning, electric, or stabbing pain or paresthesia in the chest wall, axilla, and/or ipsilateral extremity after a breast cancer operation and/or local radiation therapy or chemotherapy.

Nerve conduction investigations can be useful in the assessment of PMPS, though they should not be carried out routinely and should only be taken into consideration in specific circumstances. When polyneuropathy, brachial plexopathy, and radiculopathy are suspected as additional causes of nerve-mediated pain, electrodiagnostic investigations may be more useful in ruling them out.

By combining diffusion imaging pulse sequences with two- and three-dimensional imaging pulse sequences, magnetic resonance neurography (MRN) improves selective multiplanar viewing of peripheral nerves and disease. Pathological nerves can show aberrant enhancement, uneven shape, intra- or perineural tumor or scarring, nerve and/or fascicular caliber abnormalities, and signal discontinuities or modifications on MRN.

Ultrasound can help see nerves that are typically affected after mastectomy, such as the intercostobrachial nerve. Traumatic neuromas are hyperplastic proliferations of connective tissue and neurons that can be seen using ultrasonography. Because traumatic neuromas are frequently seen close to the surgical scar and have characteristics including an oval form, limited edge, parallel orientation, and hypoechogenicity, ultrasound may be utilized to assess them in breast cancer patients who have had mastectomy. For patients with a history of breast cancer, the gold standard for differentiating neuromas from recurrent breast cancer is ultrasound-guided core needle biopsy.

Differential diagnosis of PMPS includes phantom breast pain, cervical radiculopathy, pectoralis minor syndrome/neurogenic thoracic outlet syndrome, scapulothoracic bursitis, glenohumeral joint adhesive capsulitis, shoulder impingement syndrome, myofascial pain, and lymphedema.

== Prevention ==
Cancer patients experience significant rates of depression (10-25%), anxiety (10-30%), and post-traumatic stress disorder (35%). It has been seen that anxiety and depression lower pain thresholds and cause anatomical changes that intensify pain. The development of mild to severe PMPS after surgery is highly correlated with preoperative anxiety and depression, according to numerous long-term observational studies and systematic reviews. Multidisciplinary professionals such as psychiatrists, psychologists, counselors, medical social workers, and community support are involved in the management of psychological disorders.

Neuropathic pain resulting from injury to the nerves in the axilla and/or chest wall during surgery is one of the most widely recognized causes of PMPS. According to available data, patients who have sentinel lymph node biopsy had a much lower incidence of PMPS than those who have more extensive axillary lymph node dissection (ALND), which is thought to result in a higher risk of injury to the intercostobrachial nerve (ICBN).

Since perioperative pain is a modifiable risk factor, its management is important from a therapeutic standpoint. A number of studies have demonstrated that a substantial risk factor for PMPS is moderate to severe acute postoperative pain.

== Treatment ==
Pharmacologic therapy has long been regarded as the first-line treatment for many chronic pain syndromes, including pain associated with cancer and notably post-mastectomy pain, when used in conjunction with physical therapy. For many cancer-related pain syndromes, the standard treatment protocol entails using non-steroidal anti-inflammatory drugs (NSAIDs) first, then opioids. A few other non-opioid drugs that are currently gaining popularity are gabapentinoids (pregabalin and gabapentin), and antidepressants (selective serotonin reuptake inhibitors [SSRI], serotonin and norepinephrine reuptake inhibitors [SNRI], and tricyclic antidepressants [TCAs]).

Tricyclic antidepressants are frequently used to treat PMPS and are useful in treating a variety of neuropathic pain problems. Since amitriptyline has been demonstrated to be the best medication for neuropathic pain, it has also been recommended for PMPS. Compared to amitriptyline, venlafaxine has a more favorable adverse effect profile.

Pregabalin and gabapentin are two gabapentinoid drugs that are a mainstay of treatment for people with PMPS, specifically the neuropathic aspects of the condition. These drugs function by reducing central sensitization and preventing the transmission of pain by modifying the release of glutamate (via calcium) from stimulated pain neurons. Numerous studies have demonstrated the effectiveness of gabapentin in treating PMPS, with results demonstrating >50% pain alleviation after four weeks, successful treatment, and improvement in quality of life throughout a three-month follow-up period.

The naturally occurring alkaloid capsaicin, which is present in chillies, is a TRPV1 antagonist that reduces substance P in small fiber neurons, which attenuates pain signals and their transmission. Topical capsaicin has been used for a long time to relieve pain, and studies conducted have shown very promising results about its usage in treating pain following a mastectomy.

Peripheral nerve blockade or neurolysis of the C7–T4 stellate ganglions or PRF of the T2–T3 dorsal root ganglia are non-surgical approaches for treating peripheral nerve pain.

Recently, there has been talk of fat injection having regenerative processes that could promote tissue differentiation and soften scars. It has been demonstrated that fat injection improves pain management in neuropathic pain disorders like PMPS and lessens discomfort in burn scars.

== Outlook ==
Post-mastectomy pain syndrome has often been misdiagnosed and poorly treated; yet, some investigations have shown a gradual decrease in both the severity and related sensory abnormalities over time.

== Epidemiology ==
It is estimated that between 25% and 60% of individuals experience chronic pain following surgery for breast cancer.

== See also ==
- Breast cancer
- Neuropathic pain
