= Wide local excision =

Surgical removal of a small area of problematic tissue

A wide local excision (WLE) is a surgical procedure to remove a small area of diseased or problematic tissue with a margin of normal tissue. This procedure is commonly performed on the breast and to skin lesions, but can be used on any area of the body.

The tissue removed is examined under a microscope to confirm the type of lesion and to grade malignant tumours. This examination also determines if all of the lesion has been removed without leaving any behind.

The results of a WLE will determine any future treatments if needed.

== Wide local excision of the breast ==
A wide local excision of the breast aims to remove benign and malignant lesions while conserving the normal shape of the breast as much as possible. It is a form of breast-conserving surgery. A WLE can only be used for lesions up to 4 cm in diameter, as removal of any larger lesions could leave a visibly dented area in the breast. The extent of excision is variable, ranging from lumpectomy to quadrantectomy. A larger excision would be categorised as a mastectomy instead.
