= PMPS =

PMPS may refer to:

- People Mountain People Sea (disambiguation)
- Post-mastectomy pain syndrome
