= Breast prostheses =

Clothing that appears as breasts

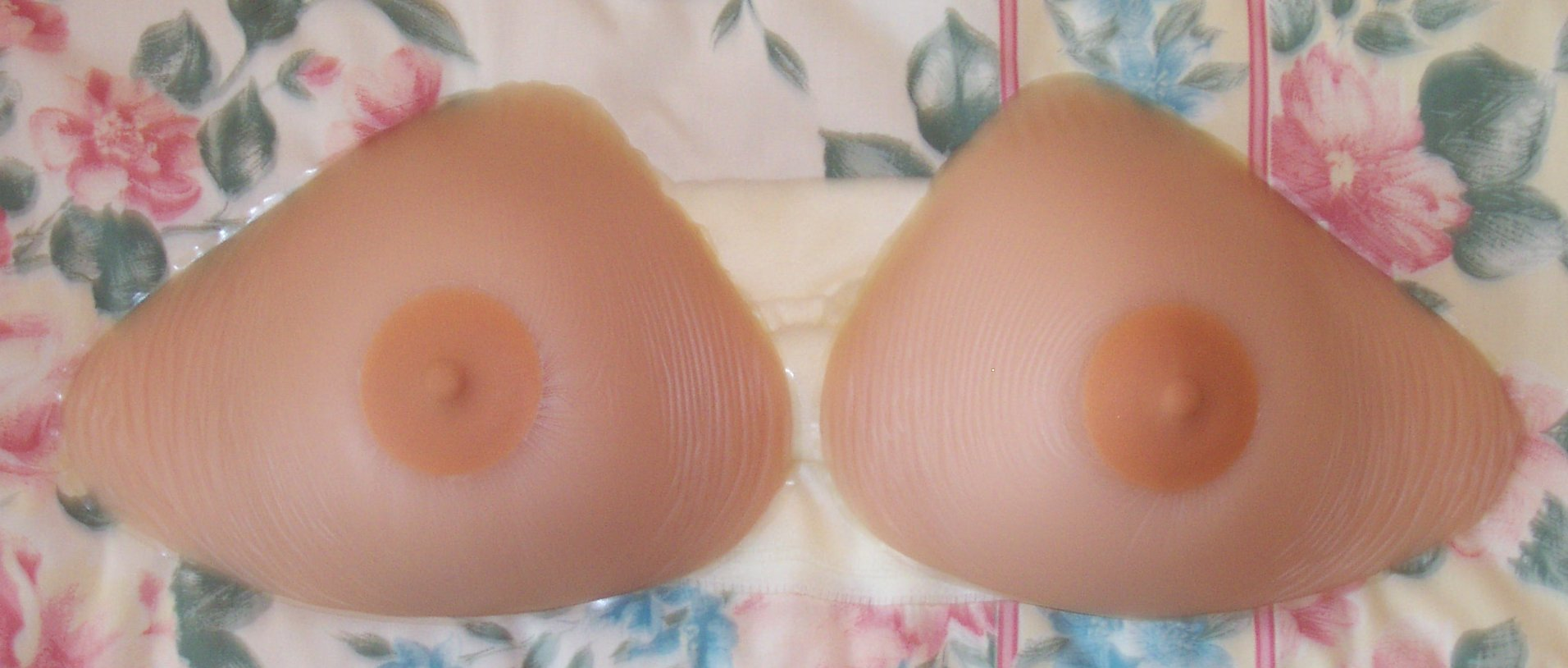
A pair of breast prostheses with glued on nipples

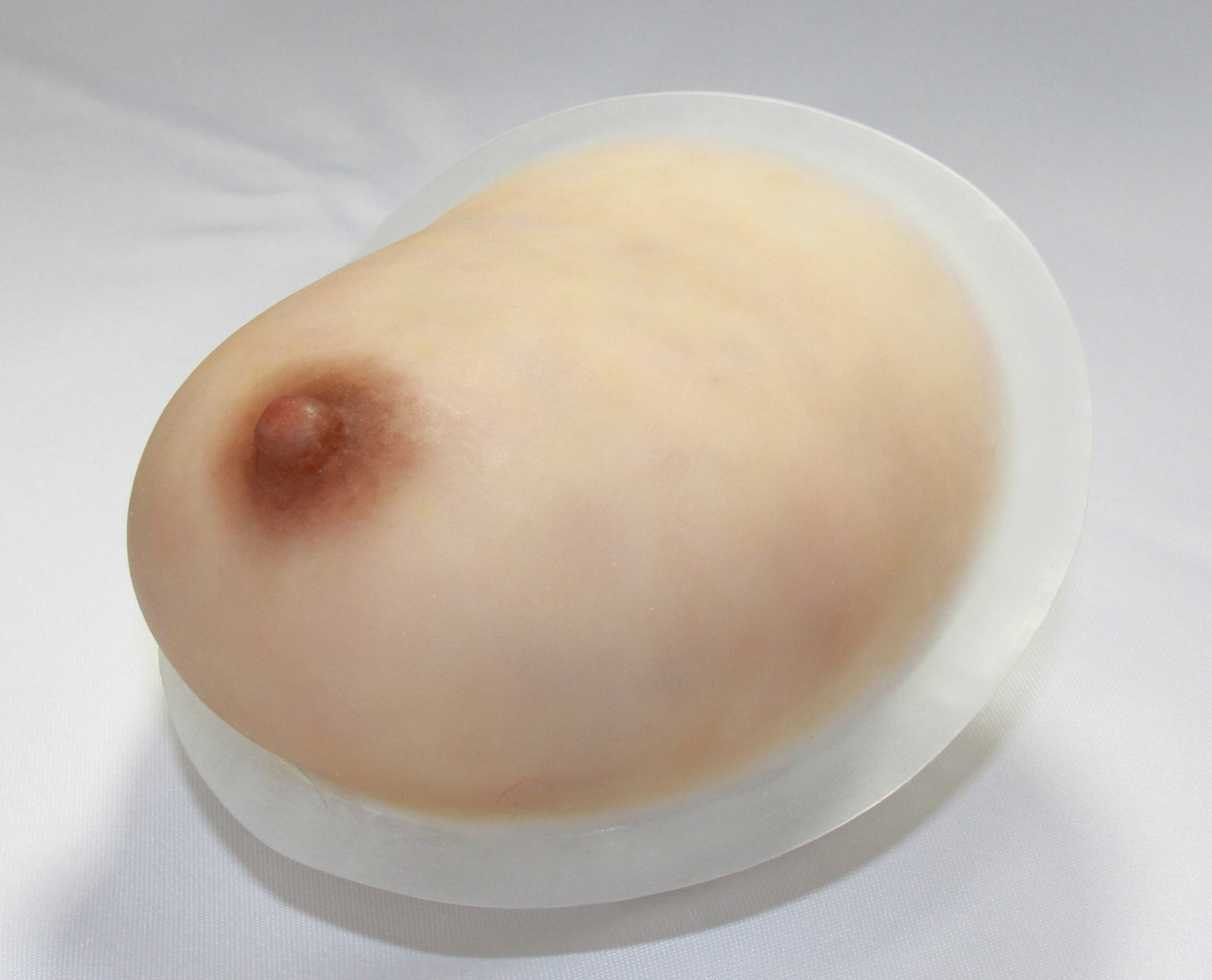
Japanese breast prostheses made using 3D scanner and craftsmanship

Breast prostheses are breast forms intended to look like breasts. They are often used after mastectomy or lumpectomy procedures or before feminizing HRT, but may also be used by for aesthetic purposes. There are a number of materials and designs; although, the most common construction is gel (silicone or water-based) in a plastic film meant to feel similar to a person's skin. There are many types of ready made breast prostheses including full or standard prostheses, partial prostheses such as shell prostheses, and stick on prostheses. Customized options are also available from specialty shops, which are moulded to fit an individual's chest by taking an impression of the breast(s). The areola and nipple may be replicated as part of the breast form or as separate nipple prosthesis. Breast prostheses come in varieties that are designed to either be held in a pocket in a mastectomy bra or attached to the skin via adhesive or other methods and worn with a standard bra. There are many factors to consider when selecting breast prostheses such as different types and the care they require, insurance coverage, and psychosocial effects.

== Uses ==
External breast prostheses are commonly used in people who have undergone surgical treatment for breast cancer such as a mastectomy or lumpectomy. They have a variety of physical benefits such balance, as well as psychological benefits such as improved self-confidence. Outside of post-surgical uses, prosthetics are also used to create the appearance of breasts.

=== Mastectomy ===
Breast prostheses are most commonly used after a mastectomy, usually a consequence of cancer. They are often molded to mimic the shape of a person's breast and can either be used temporarily or for long-term use as an alternative to, or prior to surgical breast reconstruction. Depending on the type of mastectomy performed, progress of post-operative healing, and other factors, surgeons will determine the time when a person can start to use a prosthesis. A prescription may be required for breast prostheses and mastectomy bras for insurance purposes.

Up to 90% of people use a prosthetic after surgery, temporarily or permanently.

==== Post-mastectomy bras ====
Post-mastectomy bras are similar to regular bras with the exception of containing spandex stretch pockets on the inside that help keep the breast prosthesis in place. Post-mastectomy bras can be found at specialty shops or mastectomy boutiques and some shops are also willing to stitch pockets into regular bras and swimsuits to hold prostheses.

==== Post-surgical camisoles ====
Post-surgical camisoles are convenient for women to be used immediately after their breast surgery, especially if their breasts feel sore or sensitive. They are often made with soft cotton fabric and are designed to avoid rubbing or causing irritation to the skin. The camisoles have pockets for draining and similar to post-mastectomy bras, they have stitching to help hold fiber breast prosthesis in place. Right after breast surgery, women are advised to avoid or limit their arm and shoulder movement; camisoles are ideal for this reasons because they are pulled over the hip.

==== Attachable breast prostheses ====
Attachable breast prostheses can be used as an alternative to post-mastectomy bras. Attachable breast prostheses can be attached to the skin with adhesives and can be worn with a regular bra.

==== Homemade breast prostheses ====
Some women may choose to re-purpose the supplies found in their homes to create homemade breast prostheses. For example, shoulder pads or nylons may be used as fillers for their bras. Homemade versions can be ideal for those who prefer loose-fitting clothes where the breast shape is not as defined.

=== Lumpectomy ===
After a lumpectomy or a quadrantectomy, breast prostheses can help to accommodate for the missing tissue. Examples of breast prostheses after partial breast tissue removal include partial breast prosthesis and attachable breast prostheses (also known as a contact prostheses).

Partial breast prosthesis are created in materials such as silicone, foam, or fiber.

Attachable breast prostheses are secured directly onto the body. Attachable prostheses can be custom made as a partial breast shape, as well as in full sizes. These prostheses, unlike the partial ones, move independent of a bra and can be worn with a regular bra.

=== Breast enhancement ===
==== Transgender and cross-dressing ====
Many pre or non-hormonal trans women and people who cross-dress use breast prostheses in order to create the illusion of breasts. There are also nonbinary people who use breast prostheses.

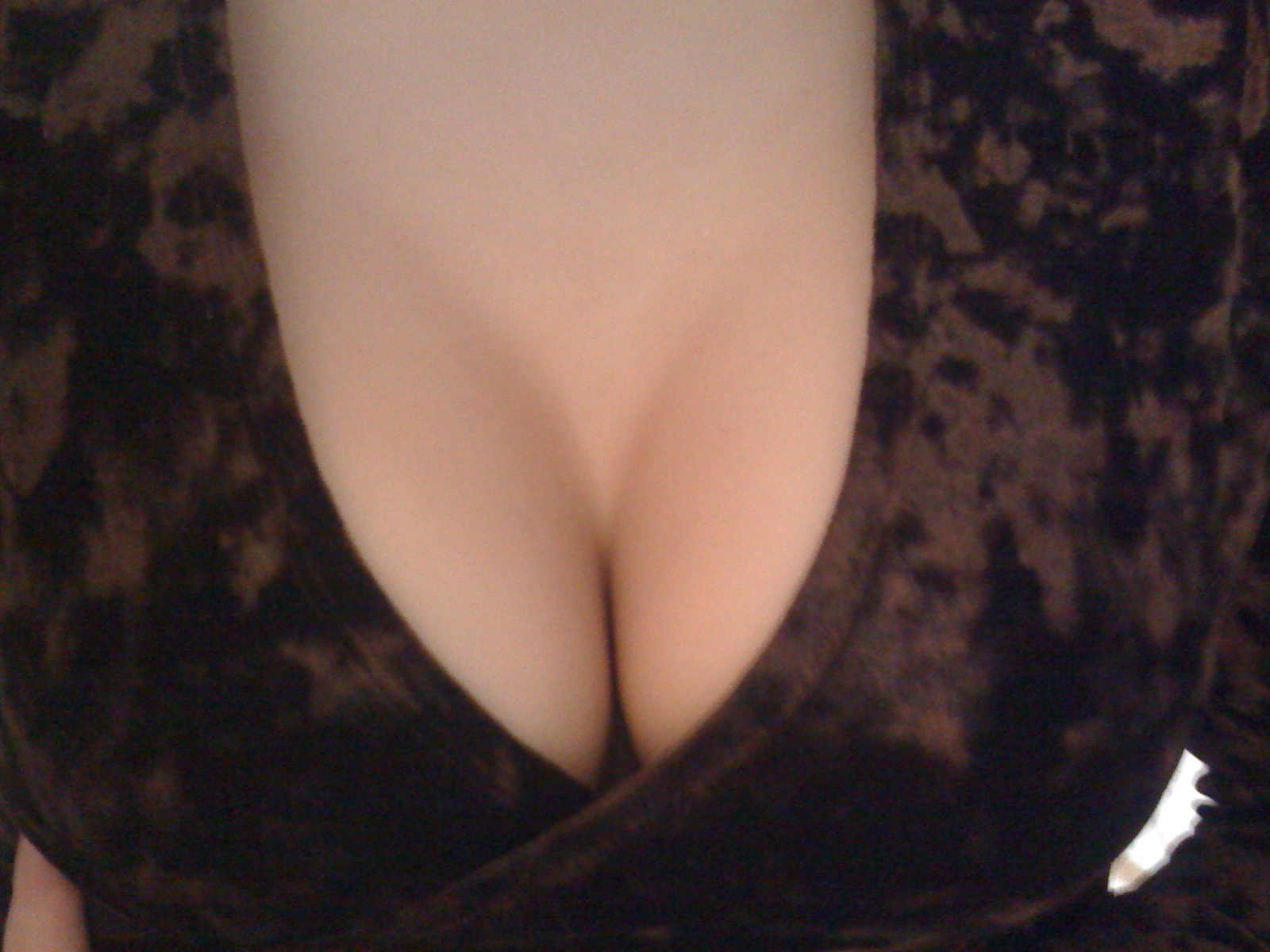
Example of a person wearing a cleavage top

Full frontal cleavage tops are also available, mainly marketed to the transgender community. They incorporate a pair of breast prostheses in a one-piece skin coloured garment that is designed to provide the illusion of natural cleavage. Such garments have the disadvantage of having a visible top edge at the neck. The edges of the breast prostheses are often distinguishable through the thin outer cover.

=== Psychosocial effects ===
After a lumpectomy or mastectomy, both physical and psychological health of people can be affected as an outcome of tissue removal. A breast prosthesis is an alternative post-surgical option to breast reconstruction to aid with these consequences. Breast tissue removal can cause people to have an altered center of gravity, and could have negative impacts on posture as well as balance. A prosthesis may help to correct balance and posture deficiencies caused by tissue removal. Additionally, partial or full loss of a breast can result in loss of self-esteem for some people. Breast prostheses can be used to lessen the insecurity.

== Types ==
=== Styles ===
- Full/standard prosthesis goes directly onto the breast wall and is used in people who have had all breast tissue removed. Size, shape and skin tone can be customized.
- Partial prosthesis contain two layers of silicone with a thin layer of film to gently adhere to the breast. Unlike a full prosthesis, this can be used in situations where part of the breast has been removed. It is worn over the breast tissue inside the bra to create a fuller appearance and fill the breast outline.
- A Shell prosthesis is a soft shell of made of silicon is placed around a smaller breast to match the size of the larger one. They are typically made to have a polyester front with a cotton backing and are lightweight.
- Stick-on prosthesis sticks onto the skin and can be either full or partial. Strapless clothing can be worn with this prosthesis if the clothing can provide some support.
- A Custom-made prosthesis is customized for color, size, and contour. Silicon and latex materials are normally used.

=== Shapes ===
Non-customised prostheses are made of different shapes to suit the extent of breast tissue removal or the shape of a person's chest. Asymmetric breast forms incorporate an extension towards the armpit to replicate the shape of the tail of Spence, while symmetric "triangle" or "teardrop" prostheses do not incorporate that extension.

=== Weight ===
Silicone breasts come in a variety of weights to fit the needs of the user and are typically designed to have the same weight as natural breasts. Lightweight forms that are about 20-40% lighter than the standard form do exist.

== History ==
Breast prostheses in the 1800s were made of rubber. On 27 January 1874, a U.S. patent for a "breast pad" was issued to Frederick Cox (No. US 146805). His design consisted of rubber pads filled with air encased in cotton. Later in 1885, Charles L. Morehouse received US patent 326915 for his "Breast-Pad", made of natural rubber and inflatable with air at normal pressure. Newer designs such as that of Laura Wolfe's in 1904 parted with the air-filled design, which was prone to punctures, in favor of down feather and silk floss filling.

While breast forms were mainly sold for post-surgical purposes, over time the aesthetic potential of these prosthetics was explored. Breast form development increased in the mid 1900s as more companies began to sell and market a variety of breast forms with new materials. Eventually, marketing for breast prosthetics expanded to target people other than cisgender women looking for a surgical prosthetic or cosmetic enhancement. Some companies created branded products for trans and non-binary people.Thanks to modern treatment methods, more and more women are now surviving breast cancer. With the increasing number of survivors, the market for breast prostheses is also growing.

=== Care ===
Although breast prostheses specific for swimming exist, extra care should be given to immediately rinse them after swimming to avoid damage from chlorine or saltwater. In general, a silicone breast prosthesis should be treated like one's own skin; it should be washed daily with soap and water and dried after. Some prosthesis may require additional or more specific care to keep it clean. Sharp objects such as brooches or pins should be avoided as they may puncture silicone breasts and cause leaking.
