= Cultural differences in breast cancer diagnosis and treatment =

Breast cancer diagnosis and treatment is influenced by different cultural backgrounds. Factors include differences in beliefs, attitudes, and treatment options that impact diverse populations throughout the world.

== Breast cancer and spirituality ==
A study examining spirituality and breast cancer showed a positive correlation between spirituality and quality of life. Religious practices, a belief in God or higher power, and a support system of family and friends were important among the African-American women studied. In Chile, prayer and perceived dependence on God to intercede and guide them through this time in their life was important for women with breast cancer. They also had social support from their faith communities. Muslim women studied commonly viewed their diagnoses as the will of God. They were also active in getting the medical treatment they needed. These women's quality of life was linked with their spiritual meaning.

Religion or spirituality is often used to help frame the diagnosis in a new way that provides meaning and purpose. Health care providers can benefit by knowing the role spirituality plays in these patients' lives, leading to better awareness of the support networks needed to help cope with the diagnosis, leading to more empathetic care.

== Cultural Perspectives by Region ==
=== China ===
The topic of breast cancer can be used to highlight the differences in treatment practices between Western countries and China. This is despite the fact that the incidence of breast cancer in China was approximately 215,600 patients in 2011, which compares closely to the incidence in the United States of America. Even with the high incidence, there has been a lack of emphasis on diagnosis and detection of breast cancer in its early stages.

In Western countries, there are many resources available for patient education and awareness of breast cancer detection as well as many therapeutic options. In China, the majority of breast cancer patients are diagnosed with Stage III/IV disease, which contrasts with Western countries, where patients are more likely to be diagnosed in the early stages. Proper diagnosis is not the only limiting factor. Patients with well-defined disease (HER2-positive) struggle with the ability to gain access to traditional chemotherapeutic options that are considered the standard of care for their Western counterparts.

The other issue most often seen in emerging markets is lack of treatment options as patients relapse following first-line therapy. In China, only about 40% of metastatic breast cancer patients who receive first-line therapy will go on to receive a second line of therapy. The situation later becomes dire, where only one-quarter of patients will receive third-line therapy. Fourth- and fifth-line therapies are virtually non-existent in China. These reported frequencies of later lines of chemotherapy among Chinese patients are significantly lower than those in Japan and the United States, where 80% of patients continue to second-line and 65% of those patients continue to third line. The main reasons for low use of later-line treatments are the lack of good therapeutic options and the financial burden of more expensive drugs. As the disease progresses, patients are more likely to turn to traditional Chinese medicine.

=== India ===
Stigma is one of the largest influences on the cultural perception of breast cancer within India. There is a widespread belief that breast cancer is contagious, even from casual contact. This often leads to the physical isolation of the patient at either the hands of the community or the patient's own. Isolation can go as far as total separation within households including rooms, food, and dinnerware in addition to cutting out close proximity with loved ones. Even with strong communication and intimate education from doctors, some patients still believe that cancer means an inevitable life of isolation and karmic justice.

Beyond physical isolation, it is common within India for patients to feel a sense of shame with a diagnosis. This shame can come from a lot of places but tends to revolve around feelings of failure in one way or another. There is a general fear of death across the population but a fear of unfulfillment was recorded more amongst women. Women are seen to be more worried about their inability as a member of the household and to be inadequate as a mother, sexual partner, wife, and daughter. This fear can either come from the effects of the cancer, treatment, post recovery disabilities, or isolation. This sense of shame also extends to their children. It's common for mothers to fear the social standing of their children due to their diagnosis, thinking about things like marriage prospects, career opportunities, and personal relationships.

The aforementioned topic of karmic justice also played a role in the overarching feelings of shame that women with breast cancer have carried. Cancer is said to be a punishment for bad deeds both from past or present lives, breast and cervical cancer said to be a punishment for sexual transgression or sexual behavior considered deviant by the community.

Human Papillomavirus (HPV)is a sexually transmitted disease, where certain strains have the risk of causing precancerous cell changes. Without proper screening and management, these cells can develop into cancers, such as vaginal, cervical, and vulvar. Still the narrative pays focus to the moral standing of one's behavior surrounding sex as the cause of reproductive cancer rather than HPV as a sexually transmissible risk of cancer.

The narrative given to cancer within Indian culture, hugely deters women from seeking early screening, proper diagnosis, and treatment as a whole. The fear of the unknown has led women further and further away from the doctor, many even admitting to ignoring present breast lumps and other concerns to a point of incurability. Even after a diagnosis women are particular in their disclosure to the community, if at all. This act protects them from discrimination, gossip, and isolation but, in parallel, isolates them from a community of support.

=== Ireland ===
Despite the fact that governments have passed policies and engage in outreach to provide equal access to healthcare and screenings, women who are intellectually disabled have lower rates of mammography than the general population. A study was done to discover reasons why women were still not taking advantage of the screenings that are now available to them.

A group of women in Ireland had recently received a mammography; they were interviewed to see what they knew about breast cancer, signs or symptoms, if they had read any material prior to their screening or how they could help prevent breast cancer from occurring. The sample of women had little knowledge in any of these areas. The women explained that their experience was positive but prior to screening they had feelings of fear, anxiety and stress because they did not know what to expect. A low level of awareness and the fear of the unknown are barriers preventing women from getting screenings. Three suggestions have been given:

1. Patients need to have access to resources to inform them about the importance of screenings and basic facts about breast cancer.
2. It is important for providers to explain the mammogram procedure and what it means; it cannot be assumed that patients already know.
3. Nurses and staff need to provide emotional support before, during and after the procedure to help relieve embarrassment, stress, fear or anxiety.

=== Turkey ===
As in many parts of the world, breast cancer is the most prevalent form of cancer in Turkey. However, women are not attending regular screening, even in high-risk populations. Though women within Turkey fear cancer, the fear is usually what drives women to treatment, their lack in medical care comes from intimate uncomfortability. The World Health Organization found that on average about 43% of OB/GYN's were female across all provinces. Still that number varied widely based on the religious atmosphere with less conservative areas like Denizli having 21% female and more conservative provinces like Erzurum, Rize, and Giresun having 80% female OB/GYN.

For many Turkish women, there is a profound disconnect between female patients and male doctors in intimate spaces such as gynecology. Due to personal, patriarchal, and religious reasons, there is hesitancy in women to seek healthcare in a way they would feel exposed, specifically in front of men. There is also a lack in proper education surrounding medical procedures like mammography, leaving women to rely on hearsay prior to experiencing it themselves, entering with a large amount of uncertainty and fear. With limiting options as to medical providers, privacy concerns, fears of potential pain, and uncertainty, women have found a sense of distrust and uncomfortability within obstetrics and gynecology fueling an avoidance of medical care.

When women do seek care, this comes from familial support and encouragement, specifically from partners. It is common culture within Turkey for the needs of the family to be considered before the needs of the women, due to worries about financial and relational hardship influencing medical decision making. Women fear their cancer will negatively affect the relationship they've built with their husbands, possibly causing separation and insecurity.

A woman's view of herself is also a battle. When asked many women associated breast cancer with losses to feminine traits such as hair, eyebrows, and breasts, causing a masculinization effect to the women. The loss of breasts is particularly a fear due to its permanent effects and perceived loss of femininity and sexual identity.

=== Palestine ===
Israel has maintained military control over Palestinian territories like the West Bank and Gaza, leaving the communities in a war zone due to a century long conflict began in 1917. Though efforts have been made for a two-state solution, Gaza and the people of Palestine, remain under fire, lacking access to necessary resources for survival, including medical care.

Within Palestine, breast cancer makes up 34% of cancers in females and 18.7% of cancer across the population, the most common in both categories. For most communities, fear is a common barrier from receiving cancer care, however, within Palestine, the shortage of qualified professionals, medical centers, medication, and treatment play the biggest role in preventing aid. In 2022, there were only seven listed oncologists, two cancer centers, twenty mammography machines, zero cancer research centers and zero professional training facilities. Limited initiatives led to a lack of public education about detection and prevention, leaving Palestinians to unreliable and generalized education from television and the internet.

Even when treatment is achieved, it is said that there is a significant inconsistency in treatments, timing, and medications. As resources thin, Palestinians fear their own death with poorer community members receiving the least. Hospitals are overcrowded with no privacy for health-related conversations or separation from others for physical exams. For Muslim women this is especially harmful due to cultural expectations surrounding modesty. Early detection finds its biggest barrier as women feel uncomfortable and exposed during breast examinations even from female medical providers, even without a lack of private rooms.

Continued research and education on cancer care has no allocated budget and is restricted to an individual based responsibility such as college related education theses. The few trained professionals are said to be trained abroad as well as early direction initiatives being funded internationally.

Policy makers and doctors are aware of the situation around cancer care and have reflected on gaps of education and access. They continue to seek international aid and to recruit additional specialists to address the urgent needs of their people.
