= Neurolysis =

Agent which degenerates nerve fibers

Neurolysis is the application of physical or chemical agents to a nerve in order to cause a temporary degeneration of targeted nerve fibers. When the nerve fibers degenerate, an interruption in the transmission of nerve signals occurs. In the medical field, neurolysis is commonly used to alleviate pain, such as in people with various forms of cancer, chronic osteoarthritis or spasticity.

Different types of neurolysis include celiac plexus neurolysis, endoscopic ultrasound guided neurolysis, and lumbar sympathetic neurolysis. Chemodenervation and nerve blocks are other forms of neurolysis.

Neurotomy may refer to the application of heat (as in radiofrequency nerve lesioning), chemical ablation, or freezing of sensory nerves with the intent of a longer term (months or years) ablation or partial denervation of one or more peripheral nerves, usually to relieve chronic pain.

== Terminology ==
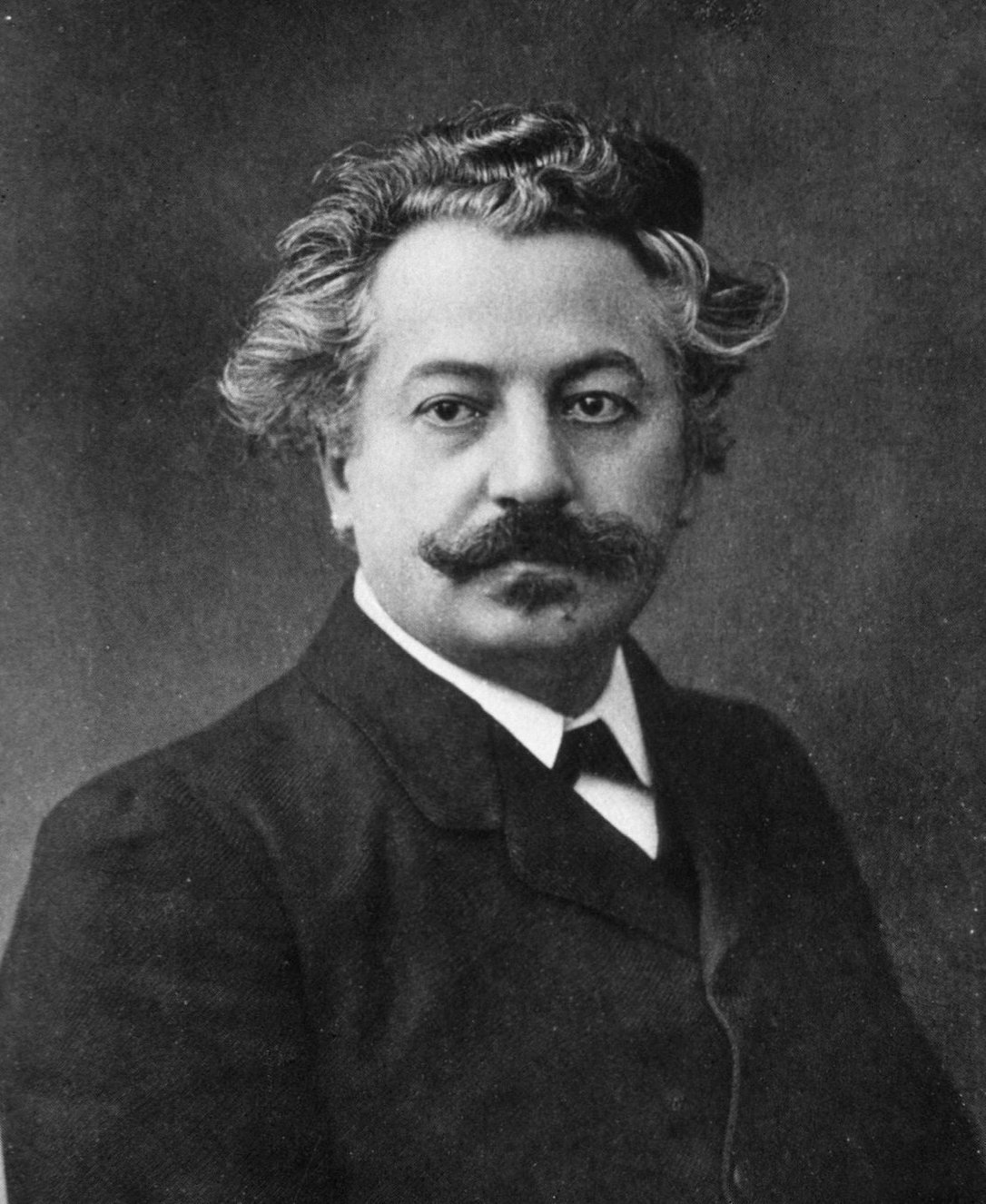
Surgeon Mathieu Jaboulay, 1910

Early neurolysis techniques were used in the 1900s for pain relief by the surgeon-neurologist Mathieu Jaboulay for vasospastic disorders, such as arterial occlusive disease before the introduction of endovascular procedures.

Neurolysis is a chemical ablation technique that is used to alleviate pain. Neurolysis is used when the disease has progressed to a point where other pain treatments are deemed ineffective. A neurolytic agent such as alcohol, phenol, or glycerol is typically injected into specific sensory nerves assessed to be transmitting pain signals.

Chemical neurolysis is used to denervate specific sensory nerves, reducing pain signals. The effects generally last for three to six months.

Neurotomy is a nerve block procedure performed in cases, such as for severe knee arthritis, in an outpatient procedure. The term neurotomy may be used as a synonym for neurectomy – the surgical cutting or removal of nervous tissue.

== Methods ==
=== Radiofrequency ablation ===
Radiofrequency ablation (RFA) uses heat generated from radio waves to disrupt sensory nerve function in anatomical structures transmitting pain sensation to the brain, such as from the back, hip, neck, or knee. RFA is an alternative for eligible people who have comorbidities or do not want to undergo more extensive surgery, such as hip or knee arthroplasty.

=== Chemical neurotomy ===
Clinical studies from 2023-25 reported that local injection of phenol was effective as a neurolytic treatment of sensory knee nerves to relieve chronic pain associated with osteoarthritis.

=== External neurolysis ===
Peripheral nerves move (glide) across bones and muscles. A peripheral nerve can be trapped by scarring of surrounding tissue which may lead to potential nerve damage or pain. An external neurolysis may be performed when scar tissue is removed from around the nerve without entering the nerve itself.

=== Celiac plexus neurolysis ===
Celiac plexus neurolysis (CPN) is the chemical ablation of the celiac plexus. This type of neurolysis is mainly used to treat pain associated with advanced pancreatic cancer. Traditional opioid medications used to treat pancreatic cancer patients may yield inadequate pain relief in the most advanced stages of pancreatic cancer, so the goal of CPN is to increase the efficiency of the medication. This in turn may lead to a decreased dosage, thereby decreasing the severity of the side effects. CPN is also used to decrease the chances of a patient developing an addiction for opioid medications due to the large doses commonly used in treatment.

CPN can be performed by percutaneous injection either anterior or posterior to the celiac plexus. CPN is generally performed complementary to nerve blocks, due to the severe pain associated with the injection itself. Neurolysis is commonly performed only after a successful celiac plexus block. CPN and celiac plexus block (CPB) are different in that CPN is permanent ablation whereas CPB is temporal pain inhibition.

There are multiple posterior percutaneous approaches, but no clinical evidence suggests that any one technique is more efficient than the rest. The posterior approaches generally utilize two needles, one at each side of the L1 vertebral body pointing towards the T12 vertebral body.

Increasing the spread of the injection may increase the efficacy of the neurolysis.

=== Endoscopic ultrasound-guided neurolysis ===
Endoscopic ultrasound (EUS)-guided neurolysis is a technique that performs neurolysis using a linear-array echoendoscope. The EUS technique is minimally invasive and is believed to be safer than the traditional percutaneous approaches. EUS-guided neurolysis technique can be used to target the celiac plexus, the celiac ganglion, or the broad plexus in the treatment of pancreatic cancer-associated pain.

EUS-guided celiac plexus neurolysis (EUS-CPN) is performed with either an oblique-viewing or forward-viewing echoendoscope and is passed through the mouth into the esophagus. From the gastroesophageal junction, EUS imaging allows the doctor to visualize the aorta, which can then be traced to the origin of the celiac artery. The celiac plexus itself cannot be identified, but is located relative to the celiac artery. The neurolysis is then performed with a spray needle that disperses a neurolytic agent, such as alcohol or phenol, into the celiac plexus.

EUS-CPN can be performed unilaterally (centrally) or bilaterally, however, there is no clinical evidence supporting the superiority of one over the other.

EUS-guided neurolysis can also be performed on the celiac ganglion and the broad plexus in a similar fashion to the EUS-CPN. The celiac ganglion neurolysis (EUS-CGN) is more effective than EUS-CPN and broad plexus neurolysis (EUS-BPN) is more effective than EUS-CGN.

=== Lumbar sympathetic neurolysis ===
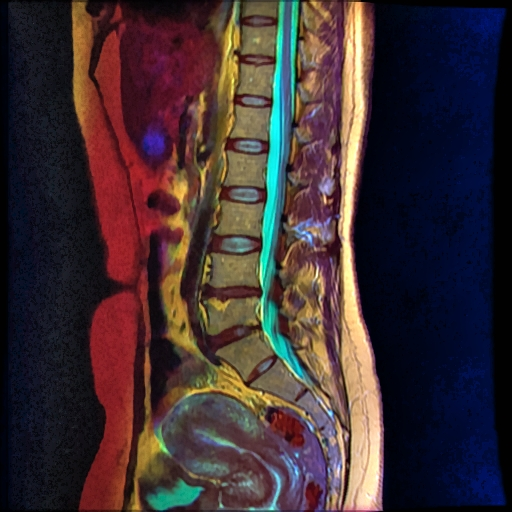
Magnetic resonance image of lumbar spine

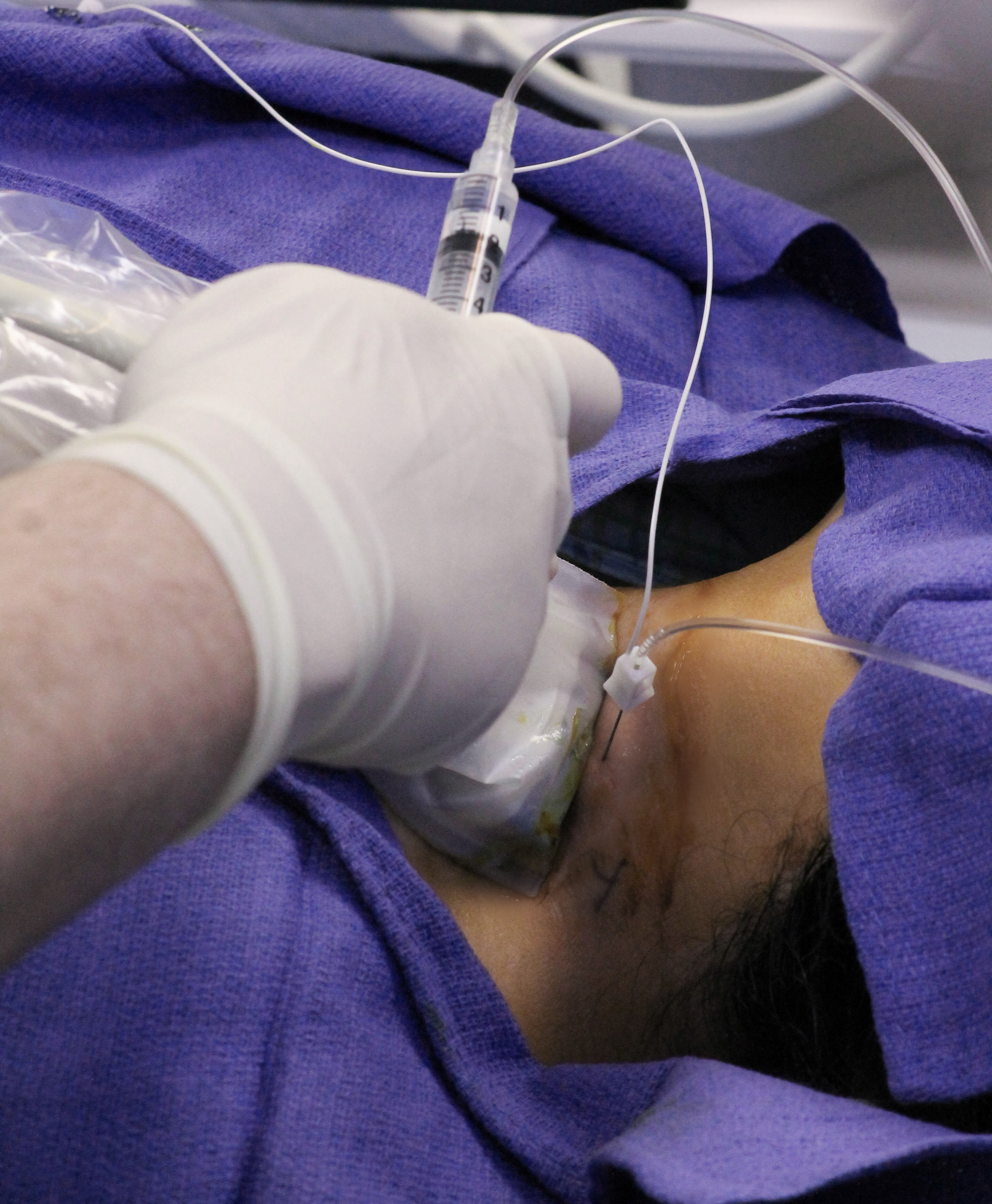
Nerve block of the cervical spine

Lumbar sympathetic neurolysis is typically used on patients with ischemic rest pain, generally associated with nonreconstructable arterial occlusive disease. Although the disease is the basis for this type of neurolysis, other diseases such as peripheral neuralgia or vasospastic disorders can receive lumbar sympathetic neurolysis for pain treatment.

Lumbar sympathetic neurolysis is performed between the L1-L4 vertebrae with separate injections at each vertebra junction. The chemicals used for neurolysis of the nerves cause destructive fibrosis and cause a disruption of the sympathetic ganglia. The vasomotor tone is decreased in the area affected by the neurolysis, which in addition to arteriovenous shunting, create a light pink appearance within the affected area. Lumbar sympathetic neurolysis alters the ischemic rest pain transmission by changing norepinephrine and catecholamine levels or by disturbing afferent fibers. This procedure is mainly used only when other feasible approaches to pain management are unable to be used.

Lumbar sympathetic neurolysis is performed by using absolute alcohol, but other chemicals such as phenol, or other techniques such as radiofrequency or laser ablation have been studied. To aid in the procedure, fluoroscopy or CT guidance is used. Fluoroscopic guidance is the most frequent, giving better real-time monitoring of the needle. The general technique of administering lumbar sympathetic neurolysis involves using three separate needles rather than one because it allows for better longitudinal spread of the chemicals.

Complications can arise from this procedure such as nerve root injury, bleeding, paralysis, and more. Complications have been seen to be diminished when using the aforementioned radiofrequency or laser ablation techniques in comparison to the injection of alcohol or phenol. Generally, approximately two-thirds of patients can expect a favorable outcome (pain relief with minimal complications). Overall, the minimally invasive technique of lumbar sympathetic neurolysis is important in the relief of ischemic rest pain.

=== Chemodenervation ===
Chemodenervation is a process used to manage pain through the use of phenol, alcohol, or a botulinum toxin (botox). The agent of choice is injected into or adjacent to a specific sensory nerve or into muscle fibers to dull neuronal pain signaling.

As chemical denervation agents, phenol and alcohol are inexpensive, fast-acting, and can be readministered or boosted within months, while also possibly causing scarring or fibrosis.

=== Cryoneurolysis ===
Cryoneurolysis is the use of ultracold miniature probes to inhibit sensory nerve function causing pain. The method involves compressing a gas (carbon dioxide or nitrous oxide) through a small aperture into a larger outer tube (1.4-2 mm diameter) at a lower pressure, enabling the gas to expand rapidly at the ablation tip. The rapid expansion of gas moving from a high to a low pressure through the narrow probe aperture causes a rapid, substantial decrease in temperature (Joule–Thomson effect) to around −70 °C (−94 °F). Applied for two-three minutes at each targeted nerve site, the ultracold gas produces ice crystals which cause edema at the nerve site, blocking nerve transmission and pain signals.

Under research and limited clinical use as of 2024, chronic pain conditions treated by cryoneurolysis include knee osteoarthritis, neuropathies, post-mastectomy pain syndrome, phantom limb pain, headaches, leg and shoulder pain, and sacroiliac joint pain. The efficacy of cryoneurolysis compared to other more common neurolytic methods for pain conditions is under study.

== Potential complications ==
Among possible clinical complications are infection at the injection site, inflammation and pain at the injection or catheter site, bleeding or bruising from injury of small blood vessels, nerve injury, allergic reaction from a local anesthetic or neurolytic medication, or tinnitus and flushing from an agent like phenol.
