= Daniel Kopans =

American radiologist

Daniel B. Kopans, MD, FACR is a radiologist specializing in mammography and other forms of breast imaging.

Dr. Daniel Kopans is a leading expert in breast cancer detection and diagnosis. He is the founder of the Breast Imaging Division in the Department of Radiology at the Massachusetts General Hospital. In 1984 he was the lead author on a paper in the New England Journal of Medicine describing the developing subspecialty of "Breast Imaging". One of the founders of this new field, Dr. Kopans has been at the forefront of combining mammography, ultrasound, and other imaging tests to aid in the detection and diagnosis of breast cancer. Dr. Kopans led the defense of screening for women ages 40–49 when an effort was made, in the 1990s, to deny these women access to screening.

Dr. Kopans is author of over 200 scientific articles. Dr. Kopans invented the Kopans Wire used in needle localization that made it possible for radiologists to accurately guide surgeons to lesions detected by mammography which made it possible to diagnose breast cancers at a smaller size and earlier stage excisional breast biopsies. He was also instrumental in creation of the Breast Imaging Reporting and Data System (BI-RADS) coding system used in all American mammography reports, serving as co-chair of a committee of the American College of Radiology which developed this system. This system helped to standardize the reporting of mammography results. Dr. Kopans has also been a leading figure in the development of breast tomosynthesis.

Kopans was a leading figure in the debate over the advisability of screening mammography beginning in the 1980s. During the early 1990s, following a decision by the National Cancer Institute to drop support for screening women in their 40s, and subsequently following series of articles in The New York Times by Gina Kolata which questioned the value of screening mammography for those in the 40-50 age group, Dr. Kopans was a leading figure during a prolonged battle, arguing in favor of the benefits of mammography. By 1997, the National Cancer Institute had reversed course and once again supported screening for women in their 40s. However, 2009 United States Preventive Services Task Force guidelines no longer recommend routine screening in women 40 to 49.

Kopans is author of the textbook Breast Imaging. He practices radiology at Massachusetts General Hospital in Boston and is a professor at Harvard Medical School.

Kopans attended Harvard College where he earned his Bachelor of Arts degree Cum Laude in 1969. He received his medical degree from Harvard Medical School in 1973, where he was also inducted into the Alpha Omega Alpha Honor Society. Following a medical internship at Dartmouth Medical School, Dr. Kopans completed his residency training in 1977 at Massachusetts General Hospital in diagnostic radiology, where he received board certification and was then appointed to the staff of the Department of Radiology at MGH one year later. The American Society of Breast Disease honored Daniel Kopans with the 2007 Pathfinder Award in Breast Imaging for his work in helping to improve breast cancer survival. He is also a recipient of a gold medal from the Society for Breast Imaging.
