= Lymph node biopsy =

- ICD-9-CM: 40.11
- MedlinePlus: 003933
- LOINC: 66112-4

Lymph node biopsy is a test in which a lymph node or a piece of a lymph node is removed for examination under a microscope (see: biopsy).

The lymphatic system is made up of several lymph nodes connected by lymph vessels. The nodes produce white blood cells (lymphocytes) that fight infections. When an infection is present, the lymph nodes swell, produce more white blood cells, and attempt to trap the organisms that are causing the infection. The lymph nodes also try to trap cancer cells.

Imaging studies include CXR, CT scans of Abdomen, chest, pelvis, neck and PET scans.

CBC, ESR, serum ferritin, bone marrow aspiration.

== Indications ==
The test is used to help determine the cause of lymph node enlargement (swollen glands or lymphadenitis). It may also determine whether tumors in the lymph node are cancerous or noncancerous. Enlarged lymph nodes may be caused by a number of conditions, ranging from very mild infections to serious malignancies. Benign conditions can often be distinguished from cancerous and infectious processes by microscopic examination. The pathologist may also perform additional tests on the lymph node tissue to assist in making a diagnosis.

Some of the conditions where abnormal values are obtained are:

- Hodgkin's lymphoma
- Non-Hodgkin's lymphoma
- Sarcoidosis
- tuberculous cervical lymphadenitis (scrofula)

Lymph node biopsies may be performed to evaluate the spread of cancer. See Lymphadenectomy#With sentinel node biopsy.

However, Sentinel lymph node biopsy for evaluating early, thin melanoma has not been shown to improve survival, and for this reason, should not be performed. Patients with melanoma in situ, T1a melanoma or T1b melanoma ≤ 0.5mm have a low risk of cancer spreading to lymph nodes and high 5-year survival rates, so this kind of biopsy is unnecessary.

== Procedure ==
The test is done in an operating room in a hospital, or at an outpatient surgical facility. There are two ways the sample may be obtained:

- Needle biopsy
- Open (excisional) biopsy

=== Needle biopsy ===
A needle biopsy involves inserting a needle into a node to obtain the sample.

The patient lies on the examination table; the biopsy site is cleansed; and a local anesthetic is injected. The biopsy needle is then inserted into the node. A sample is removed, pressure is applied to the site to stop the bleeding, and a bandage is applied.

=== Open biopsy ===
An open biopsy consists of surgically removing all or part of a node.

The patient lies on the examination table and is given a sedative. The skin over the biopsy site is cleansed, and a local anesthetic is injected (occasionally, a general anesthetic is given). A small incision is made, and the lymph node or part of the node is removed. The incision is then closed with stitches and bandaged.

The sample is then sent to pathology.

With this test there is a small chance of infection or bleeding. Additionally, there is a moderate risk of nerve injury, localized paralysis, or numbness when the biopsy is performed on a lymph node close to nerves.
