= Needle-localized biopsy =

Medical procedure

Needle-localized biopsy is a procedure that uses very thin needles or guide wires to mark the location of an abnormal area of tissue so it can be surgically sampled. An imaging device such as an ultrasound probe is used to place the wire in or around the abnormal area. Needle localization is used when the doctor cannot feel the mass of abnormal tissue.

Needle localizations are commonly performed by radiologists before excisional biopsy of breast lesions, using one of a number of commercially available needle and wire systems such as the Kopans wire.

A similar process is used by radiologists to localize known malignancies that have previously undergone core biopsy so that the tumor can be definitively removed.
