= Capsulitis =

Inflammation of a joint capsule

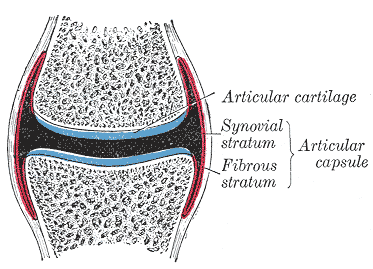
- Joint capsule(articular capsule)
- Specialty: Orthopedic

In anatomy, capsulitis is inflammation of a capsule.

Types include:

- Adhesive capsulitis of shoulder
- Plica syndrome, which is an inflammation of the articular capsule of the knee joint

== Adhesive capsulitis of shoulder ==
Adhesive capsulitis of shoulder, also known as frozen shoulder, commonly causes shoulder pain and stiffness. These sensations can be very painful and may last up to two or three years.

=== Treatment ===
==== Manual therapy and exercise ====
Manual therapy involves the movement of joints and other structures by a healthcare professional such as a physiotherapist. Exercise is the movement of joints and purposeful muscle contraction. Both manual therapy and exercise are used to attempt to relieve pain and soreness and increase joint range and function. There is moderate quality evidence that manual therapy and exercise may help significantly decrease pain in patients with adhesive capsulitis of shoulder. However the study also indicates that glucocorticoid (a type of anti-inflammatory) injections were more effective.

== See also ==
- Articular capsule
