= Quadrantectomy =

Surgical removal of part of the breast

- Specialty: Surgical oncology

A quadrantectomy, also referred to as a segmental or partial mastectomy, is a breast-conserving surgery for breast cancer in which one quarter of breast tissue is removed along with muscles of the chest wall within a 2 to 3 centimeter radius of a tumor. This procedure is an alternative to a radical or simple mastectomy, in which an entire breast is removed.

In a study that followed patients who underwent this procedure, it was found that only 9% of people who had a quadrantectomy experienced a relapse of the cancer.

== See also ==
- Mastectomy
- Lumpectomy
