= Axillary dissection =

Surgical procedure that incises the axilla

Axillary dissection is a surgical procedure that incises the axilla, usually in order to identify, examine, or take out lymph nodes. The term "axilla" refers to the armpit or underarm section of the body. The axillary dissection procedure is commonly used in treating the underarm portion of women who are dealing with breast cancer. The lymph nodes located in the axilla area that are affected by breast cancer are called the guardian or sentinel lymph nodes. Lymph nodes are essential to the lymphatic/immune system due to their main function of filtering unrecognized particles and molecules. The idea of treating breast cancer with the axillary dissection procedure was introduced in the 18th century and was backed by German physician Lorenz Heister. There are certain criteria that make patients eligible candidates for this procedure. Patients tend to have three different levels of axillary lymph nodes; the level helps to determine whether or not the patient should undergo axillary dissection.

== Appropriate Candidates for Treatment ==
This treatment is only appropriate for women who are node positive or who have tested positive for disease in the armpit area. Conducting the axillary dissection procedure on patients who are node negative can result in over-treatment and unnecessary procedures for patients to endure. To determine if a patient is permitted to receive treatment, the number of affected axillary nodes will have to be counted for. If there are only one or two affected guardian lymph nodes, then it may not be necessary for the patient to undergo the axillary dissection procedure. However, if a patient contains at least three or more affected guardian lymph nodes, then a physician will recommend that the patient undergo axillary dissection.

== The Three Levels of Axillary Lymph Nodes ==
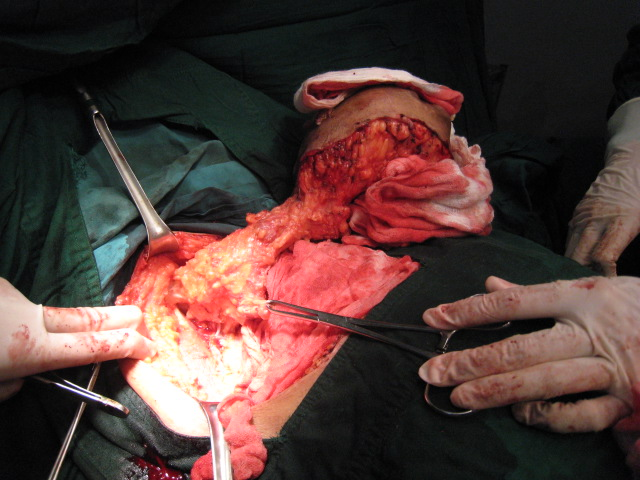
This image shows the surgical procedure of axillary dissection.

There are three different levels of axillary lymph nodes. Level I refers to lymph nodes located below the axillary vein or towards the very bottom end of the pectoralis minor muscle. Level II refers to lymph nodes located directly under the pectoralis minor muscle. Level III refers to lymph nodes that are located over the pectoralis minor muscle and would require an intense procedure. Typically lymph nodes located in Levels I and II are removed with the axillary dissection. A mastectomy may also have to accompany this procedure in some cases depending on the patient.
