= Breast-conserving surgery =

Surgical operation

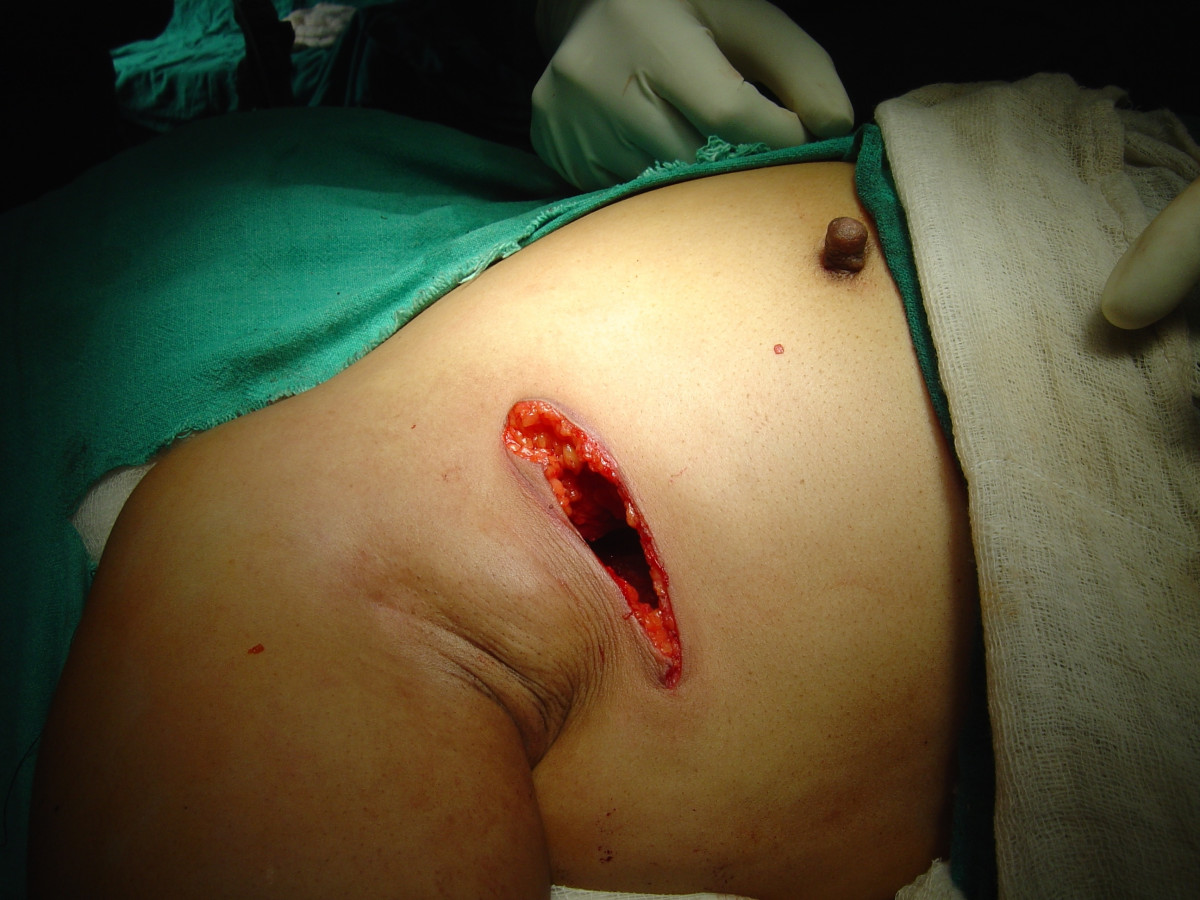
- Breast-conserving surgery avoids removing the entire breast
- ICD-9-CM: 85.21-85.23
- MeSH: D015412

Breast-conserving surgery refers to an operation that aims to remove breast cancer while avoiding a mastectomy. Different forms of this operation include: lumpectomy (tylectomy), wide local excision, segmental resection, and quadrantectomy. Breast-conserving surgery has been increasingly accepted as an alternative to mastectomy in specific patients, as it provides tumor removal while maintaining an acceptable cosmetic outcome.

== Medical uses ==
For clinical stages I and II breast cancer, breast-conserving surgery, with radiotherapy and possibly chemotherapy may be indicated if one or two sentinel lymph nodes are found to have cancer which is not extensive. In this case, the sentinel lymph nodes would be examined, and lymphadenectomy as further evaluation is not indicated as this result from the sentinel lymph nodes is sufficient to recommend treatment.

Breast-conserving surgery may also be used in cases of biopsy-proven invasive breast cancer or biopsy-proven ductal carcinoma in situ. In the assessment of the tumor, the surgeon should assess the ability to resect the tumor with clear margins while providing a cosmetic result that is acceptable to the patient.

For screening detected lesions that are non-palpable, preoperative lesion localization by a breast radiologist is required in order to accurately identify the tumor intraoperatively and excise it with adequate margins. Preoperative localization was traditionally performed using a steel guidewire; however, novel tumor markers have emerged such as radioactive seeds, radiofrequency reflectors and magnetic seeds.

Shared decision-making is an important consideration in breast-conserving surgery. It is estimated that between 50% and 70% of patients are active participants in the decision-making of breast cancer surgery. The time following a cancer diagnosis may be filled with fear, vulnerability, and a sense of being overwhelmed at the amount of information being provided by physicians as well as accessed on the internet. Each patient has their own set of unique characteristics, which may make it challenging to read information online and apply that information to a specific individual circumstance. In addition, there are several important misconceptions regarding breast-conservation surgery for patients and clinicians to keep in mind.

1. In appropriately selected patients, mastectomy and breast-conserving surgery have equivalent survival rates.
2. Undergoing mastectomy does not eliminate the risk for recurrent or new cancer.
3. Radiation therapy may still be needed following breast-conservation surgery.
4. The decision regarding the need for chemotherapy is independent from the surgical options.

== Contraindications ==
Absolute contraindications, which are reasons why the procedure absolutely cannot be done, include:

1. Pregnancy is an absolute contraindication to the use of breast irradiation. In some cases, it may be possible to perform breast-conserving surgery in the third trimester and treat the patient with radiation after delivery.
2. Two or more primary tumors in separate quadrants of the breast or with diffuse malignant-appearing microcalcifications.
3. A history of prior therapeutic irradiation to the breast that would require re-treatment to an excessively high total dose.
4. Persistent positive margins after reasonable surgical attempts: the importance of a single focally positive microscopic margin needs further study and may not be an absolute contraindication.
5. Inflammatory breast cancer
6. Diffuse or indeterminate micro-calcifications on mammography

Relative contraindications encompass situations of higher risk of complications to the patient that may be outweighed by other considerations, such as the benefit to the patient. Relative contraindications include:

1. Previous breast radiation therapy
2. Connective tissue disease such as Scleroderma, Sjogren Syndrome, Lupus, and Rheumatoid arthritis may result in an increased risk of radiation toxicity.
3. Very large tumor size relative to breast volume.

== Oncoplastic surgery ==
Oncoplastic surgery is an important consideration in breast-conserving surgery that integrates plastic surgery principles into breast cancer surgery in order to preserve aesthetic outcomes and quality of life, without compromising local control of the cancer. It is based on three surgical principles: ideal breast cancer surgery with free tumor margins, immediate breast reconstruction, and immediate symmetry with the other breast. Oncoplastic approaches to breast-conserving surgery may require a close partnership among surgeons who specialize in surgical oncology and plastic surgery. Oncoplastic surgery is not only limited to breast-conserving surgery, as the techniques and principles of plastic surgery can be applied to mastectomy as well.

The evidence comparing oncoplastic breast-conserving surgery to traditional breast-conserving surgery techniques is weak. There is no strong evidence to suggest that oncoplastic breast conserving surgery results in worse outcomes compared to other breast-conserving surgical techniques.

== History ==
Prior to 1981, there existed limited evidence that breast-conserving surgery was an acceptable alternative to radical mastectomy for treatment of early stage breast cancer. Dr. Umberto Veronesi, an Italian oncologist, challenged this notion and led a clinical trial comparing the radical mastectomy with breast-conserving surgery (which was termed quadrantectomy at the time). This landmark trial showed no differences in overall survival, disease-free survival, and local recurrence for patients with breast cancer of less than 2 cm and no palpable axillary nodes. He was widely celebrated for this landmark study, so much so that some began referring to this operation as the Veronesi Quadrantectomy. The work of Bernard Fisher, who performed a randomized trial comparing lumpectomy, lumpectomy plus radiation and total mastectomy, was also pivotal in the establishment of breast-conserving surgery.
