= People Mountain People Sea =

- Chinese: 人山人海
- Literal meaning: Huge crowds of people
Transcriptions
Standard Mandarin
- Hanyu Pinyin: Rén Shān Rén Hǎi
Wu
- Wugniu: gnin^{2} sae^{1} gnin^{2} he^{3}
- IPA: Shanghainese: [ȵin˩ se˦ ȵin˨ he˩]
Yue: Cantonese
- Jyutping: jan^{4} saan^{1} jan^{4} hoi^{2}
- IPA: [jɐn˩.san˥.jɐn˩.hɔj˧˥]
Southern Min
- Hokkien POJ: lîn-san-lîn-hái

People mountain people sea, a Chinglish phrase meaning "huge crowds of people", may refer to:

- People Mountain People Sea (label), a Hong Kong record label
- People Mountain People Sea (film), a 2011 Chinese film
