= Lymphadenectomy =

Surgical removal of lymph nodes

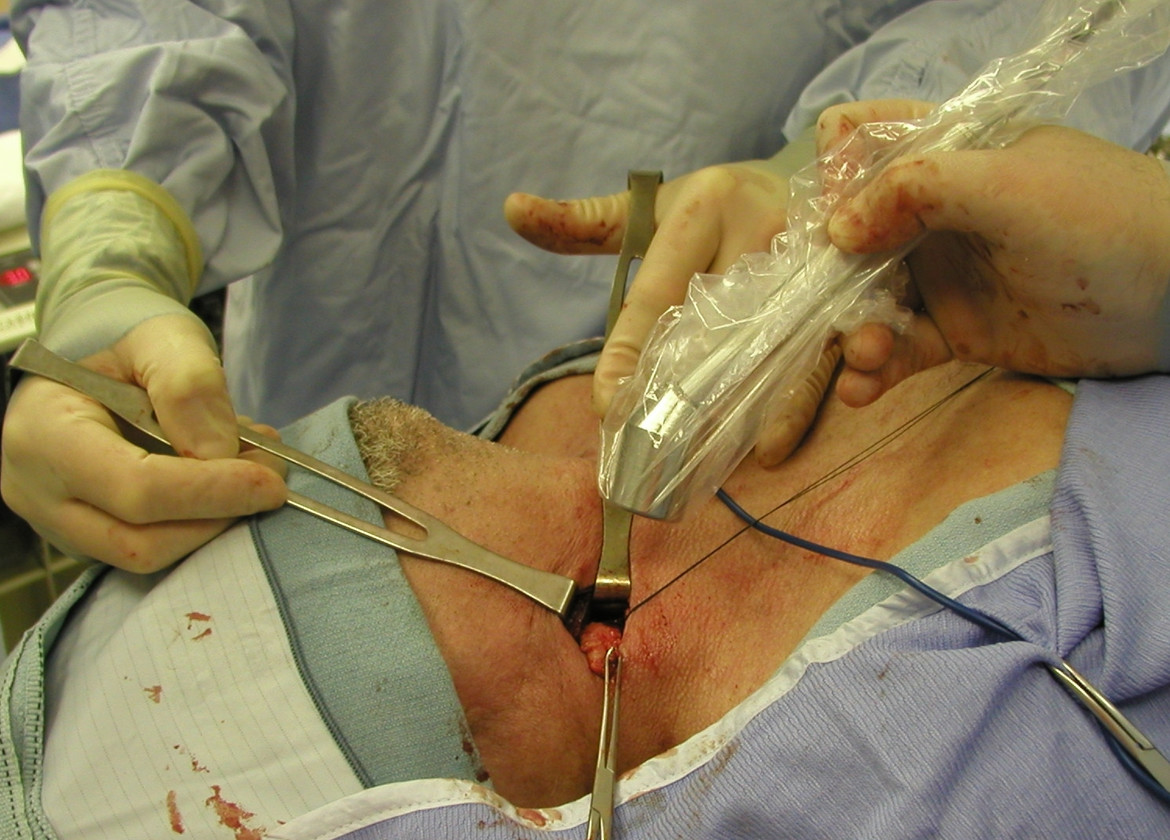
- Other names: Lymph node dissection
- ICD-9-CM: 40.2-40.5

Lymphadenectomy, or lymph node dissection, is the surgical removal of one or more groups of lymph nodes. It is almost always performed as part of the surgical management of cancer. In a regional lymph node dissection, some of the lymph nodes in the tumor area are removed; in a radical lymph node dissection, most or all of the lymph nodes in the tumor area are removed.

== Indications ==
Lymphadenectomies are usually done because many types of cancer have a marked tendency to produce lymph node metastasis early in their natural histories. This is particularly true of melanoma, head and neck cancer, differentiated thyroid cancer, breast cancer, lung cancer, gastric cancer, and colorectal cancer. Famed British surgeon Berkeley Moynihan once remarked that "the surgery of cancer is not the surgery of organs; it is the surgery of the lymphatic system."

The better-known examples of lymphadenectomy are axillary lymph node dissection for breast cancer; radical neck dissection for head and neck cancer and thyroid cancer; D2 lymphadenectomy for gastric cancer; and total mesorectal excision for rectal cancer.

=== With sentinel node biopsy ===
For clinical stages I and II breast cancer, axillary lymph node dissection should only be performed after first attempting a sentinel node biopsy. A sentinel node biopsy can establish cancer staging of the axilla if there are positive lymph nodes present. It is also less risky than performing a lymphadenectomy, having fewer side effects and a much lower chance of causing lymphedema. If cancer is not present in the sentinel lymph nodes, then the axillary lymph node dissection should not be performed.

If one or two sentinel nodes have cancer that is not extensive, then no axillary dissection should be performed, but the person with cancer should have breast-conserving surgery and chemotherapy appropriate for their stage of cancer.

== Complications ==
Lymphedema may result from lymphadenectomy. Extensive resection of lymphatic tissue can lead to the formation of a lymphocele.

It is uncertain whether inserting wound drainage after groin lymph nodes dissection can reduce complications such as seroma, haematoma, wound dehiscence, and wound infection.

== See also ==
- List of surgeries by type
