= Mastectomy =

Surgical removal of one or both breasts

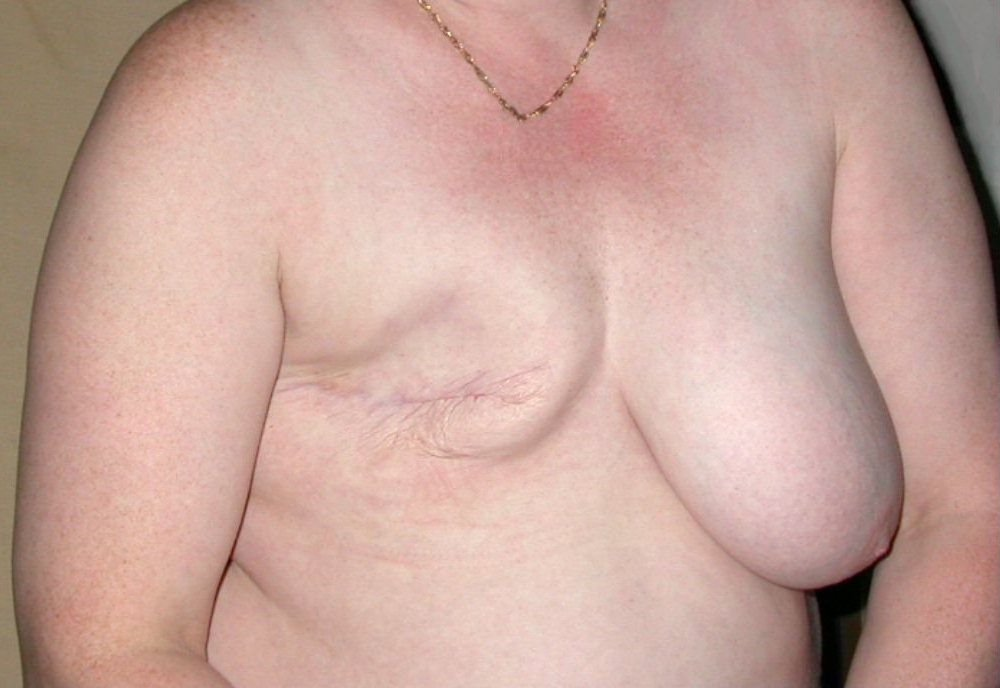
- Woman following the removal of the right breast
- ICD-9-CM: 85.4
- MeSH: D008408
- MedlinePlus: 002919

Mastectomy is the medical term for the surgical removal of one or both breasts, partially or completely. A mastectomy is usually carried out to treat breast cancer. In some cases, women believed to be at high risk of breast cancer choose to have the operation as a preventive measure. Alternatively, some women can choose to have a wide local excision, also known as a lumpectomy, an operation in which a small volume of breast tissue containing the tumor and a surrounding margin of healthy tissue is removed to conserve the breast. Both mastectomy and lumpectomy are referred to as "local therapies" for breast cancer, targeting the area of the tumor, as opposed to systemic therapies, such as chemotherapy, hormonal therapy, or immunotherapy.

The decision to perform a mastectomy to treat cancer is based on various factors, including breast size, the number of lesions, biologic aggressiveness of a breast cancer, the availability of adjuvant radiation, and the willingness of the patient to accept higher rates of tumor recurrences after lumpectomy and/or radiation. Outcome studies comparing mastectomy to lumpectomy with radiation have suggested that routine radical mastectomy surgeries will not always prevent later distant secondary tumors arising from micro-metastases prior to discovery, diagnosis, and operation. In most circumstances, there is no difference in both overall survival and breast cancer recurrence rate. While there are both medical and non-medical indications for mastectomy, the clinical guidelines and patient expectations for before and after surgery remain the same.

Mastectomies may also be carried out for transgender men and non-binary people to alleviate gender dysphoria. When part of gender-affirming care, mastectomies are commonly referred to as "top surgery".

Intersex men with gynecomastia may also choose to undergo mastectomies.

== Mastectomy indications ==
=== Breast cancer ===
Despite the increased ability to offer breast conservation techniques to those with breast cancer, certain groups may be better served by traditional mastectomy procedures including:

- women who have already undergone radiation therapy to the affected breast
- women with 2 or more areas of cancer in the same breast that are too far apart to be removed through 1 surgical incision
- women whose initial lumpectomy along with (one or more) re-excisions has not completely removed the cancer
- women with certain serious connective tissue diseases such as scleroderma, which make them especially sensitive to the side effects of radiation therapy
- pregnant women who would require radiation while still pregnant (risking harm to the child)
- women with a tumor larger than 5 cm (2.0 in) that doesn't shrink very much with neoadjuvant chemotherapy
- women with cancer that is large relative to their breast size
- women who have tested positive for a deleterious mutation on the BRCA1 or BRCA2 gene and opt for a preventive mastectomy since they are at high risk for the development of breast cancer.

=== Other uses ===
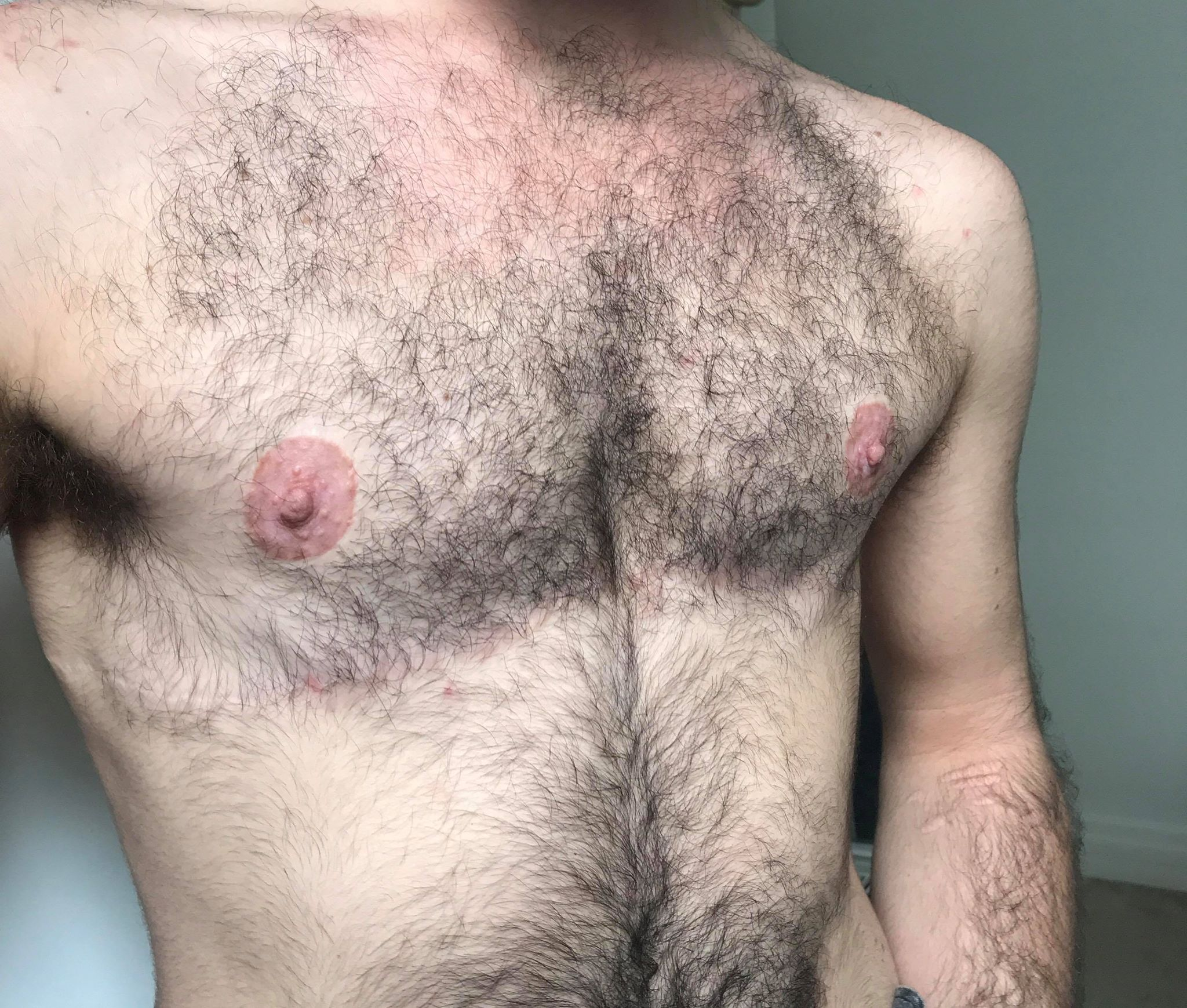
Transgender man with a masculinized chest via double lateral incision mastectomy

Mastectomy has non-cancer medical uses as well, including cosmetic or reconstructive surgery. Intersex men with gynecomastia may be eligible for mastectomy, but minimally invasive surgical techniques also exist.

Transgender men and non-binary people who have breasts may undergo a mastectomy as a gender-affirming surgery. Within the transgender community, double mastectomies are more commonly referred to as "top surgery".

== Side effects ==
Aside from the post-surgical pain and the obvious change in the shape of the chest and/or breast(s), possible side effects of a mastectomy include soreness, scar tissue at the site of the incision, short-term swelling, phantom breast pain (pain in the breast or tissue that has been removed), wound infection or bleeding, hematoma (buildup of blood in the wound), and seroma (buildup of clear fluid in the wound). If the lymph nodes are also removed, additional side effects such as lymphedema (swelling of the lymph nodes) may occur.

Upper limb problems such as shoulder and arm pain, weakness, and restricted movement are a common side effect after breast cancer surgery. According to research in the UK, an exercise programme started 7–10 days after surgery can reduce upper limb problems.

== Types ==
As of April 2026, there are several surgical approaches to mastectomy, and the type that a person decides to undergo (or whether they will decide instead to have a lumpectomy) depends on factors such as the size, location, and behavior of the tumor (if one is present), whether or not the surgery is prophylactic or preventative, and whether the person intends to undergo reconstructive surgery after the mastectomy. For trans people undergoing a gender-affirming mastectomy, the type of procedure chosen can also vary depending on the desired results, the scarring (or lack thereof), the recovery process, the person's desire for nipple sensation, and other different factors based both on personal preference and input from medical experts.

=== Simple mastectomy ===
In a simple mastectomy (or "total mastectomy), the entire breast tissue is removed, but axillary contents are undisturbed. Sometimes the "sentinel lymph node"—that is, the first axillary lymph node that the metastasizing cancer cells would be expected to drain into—is removed. People who undergo a simple mastectomy can usually leave the hospital after a brief stay. Frequently, a drainage tube is inserted during surgery in their chest and attached to a small suction device to remove subcutaneous fluid. These are usually removed several days after surgery as drainage decrease to less than 20-30 ml per day. People that are more likely to have the procedure of a simple or total mastectomy are those who have large areas of ductal carcinoma in situ, who are removing the breast because of the possibility of breast cancer occurring in the future (prophylactic mastectomies), or who have a mastectomy as a gender-affirming surgery. When this procedure is done on a cancerous breast, it is sometimes also done on the healthy breast to forestall the appearance of cancer there, or as a "balancing" or "symmetrizing" surgery resulting in a flat chest. However, the possible benefits appear to be marginal at best in the absence of genetic indicators, according to a large-scale study published in 2014. For healthy people known to be at high risk for breast cancer, this surgery is sometimes done bilaterally (on both breasts) as a cancer-preventive measure. A systematic review found that women who had both breasts removed in this circumstance were, overall, satisfied with their decision. They had fewer complications than women who had breast reconstruction but had slightly more complications than women who had one breast removed.

=== Radical mastectomy ===
The first radical mastectomy (or "Halsted mastectomy") was performed in 1882. This procedure involves removing the entire breast, the axillary lymph nodes, and the pectoralis major and minor muscles behind the breast. This procedure is more disfiguring than a modified radical mastectomy and provides no survival benefit for most tumors. This operation is now reserved for tumors involving the pectoralis major muscle or recurrent breast cancer involving the chest wall. It is only recommended for breast cancer that has spread to the chest muscles. Radical mastectomies have been reserved for only those cases because they can be disfiguring and modified radical mastectomies have been proven to be just as effective.

==== Modified radical mastectomy ====
During a modified radical mastectomy, the entire breast tissue is removed along with the axillary contents (fatty tissue and lymph nodes). In contrast to a radical mastectomy, the pectoral muscles are spared. This type of mastectomy is used for cancer patients to examine the lymph nodes because this helps to identify whether the cancer cells have spread beyond the breasts.

==== Extended radical mastectomy ====
An extended radical mastectomy is a radical mastectomy with intrapleural en bloc resection of internal mammary lymph node by sternal splitting.

=== Skin-sparing mastectomy ===
In a skin-sparing mastectomy, the breast tissue is removed through a conservative incision made around the areola (the dark part surrounding the nipple). The increased amount of skin preserved as compared to traditional mastectomy resections serves to facilitate breast reconstruction procedures. People with cancers that involve the skin, such as inflammatory cancer, are not candidates for skin-sparing mastectomy. The effectiveness and safety profile of skin-sparing mastectomy procedures have also not been well studied. During this surgery, the skin flap may be perfused with fluids and indocyanine green angiography is sometimes suggested to help prevent the skin that has been saved from dying to improve reconstruction if the person wishes to do so. There is no clear evidence on the effectiveness of this approach.

=== Nipple-sparing mastectomy ===
During a nipple-sparing mastectomy (or subcutaneous mastectomy), breast tissue is removed, but the nipple-areola complex is preserved. This procedure was historically done only prophylactically or with mastectomy for the benign disease over the fear of increased cancer development in retained areolar ductal tissue. Recent series suggest that it may be an oncologically sound procedure for tumors not in the subareolar position.

=== Sensation-preserving mastectomy ===
Sensation-preserving mastectomy aims to preserve or restore sensation to the chest wall and, in some cases, the nipple–areolar complex following mastectomy. It involves identifying and sparing key sensory nerves or reconnecting them using microsurgical nerve grafting. Dr. Anne Peled and Dr. Ziv Peled published one of the first techniques combining nerve preservation with nipple-sparing mastectomy and implant-based reconstruction.

=== Prophylactic mastectomy ===
A prophylactic mastectomy procedure is used as a preventive measure against breast cancer. The surgery is aimed to remove all breast tissue that could potentially develop into breast cancer. The surgery is generally considered when a woman has BRCA1 or BRCA2 genetic mutations. The tissue from just beneath the skin to the chest wall and around the borders of the breast needs to be removed from both breasts during this procedure. Because breast cancer develops in the glandular tissue, the milk ducts and milk lobules must be removed also. Because the region is so large-ranging, from the collarbone to the lower rib margin and from the middle of the chest around the side and under the arm, it is very difficult to remove all of the tissue. This genetic mutation is a high-risk factor for the development of breast cancer, family history, or atypical lobular hyperplasia (when irregular cells line the milk lobes). This type of procedure is said to reduce the risk of breast cancer by 100%. However, other circumstances may affect the outcome. Studies have shown that pre-menopausal women have had a higher survival rate after this procedure had been done.

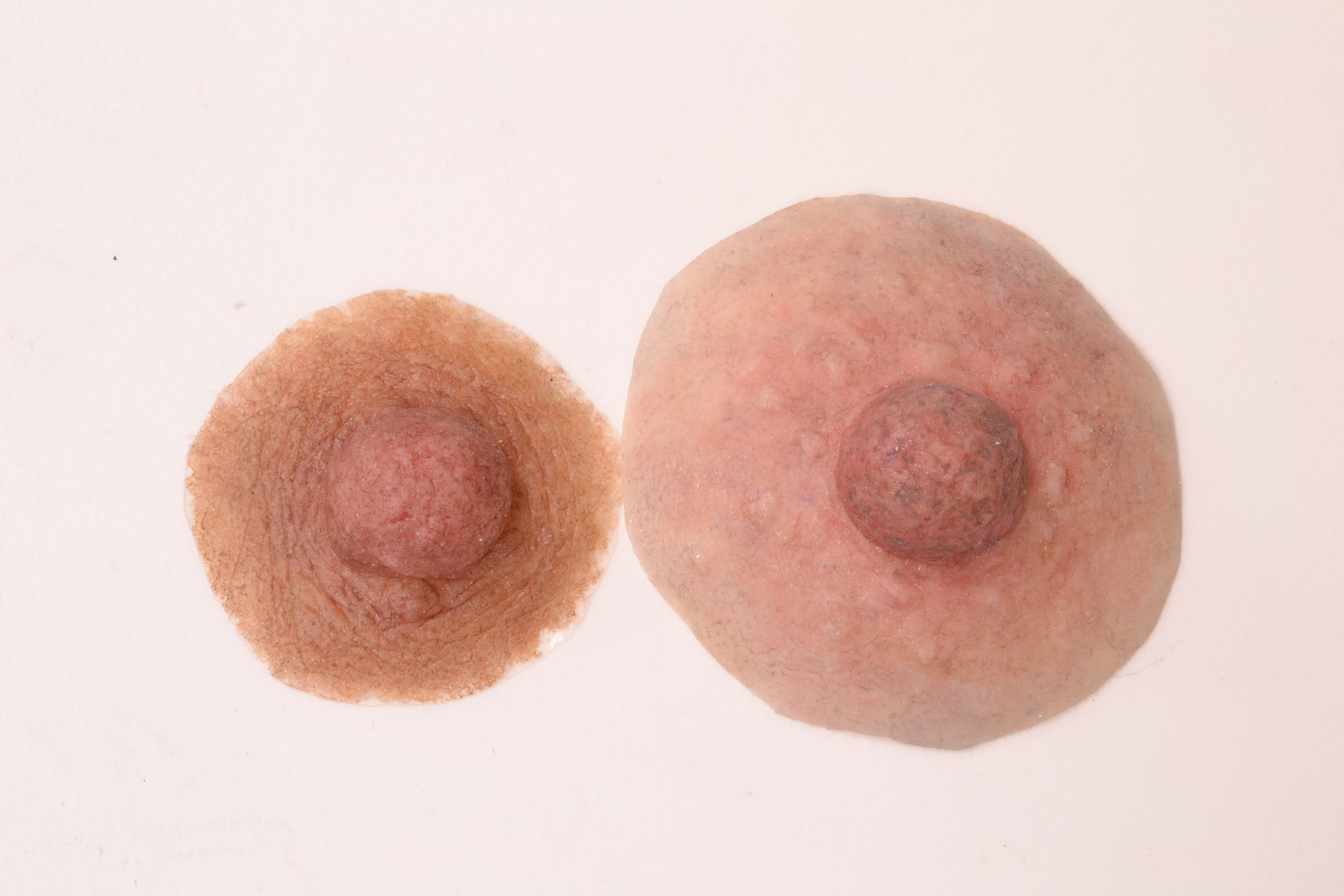
Examples of custom nipple prostheses

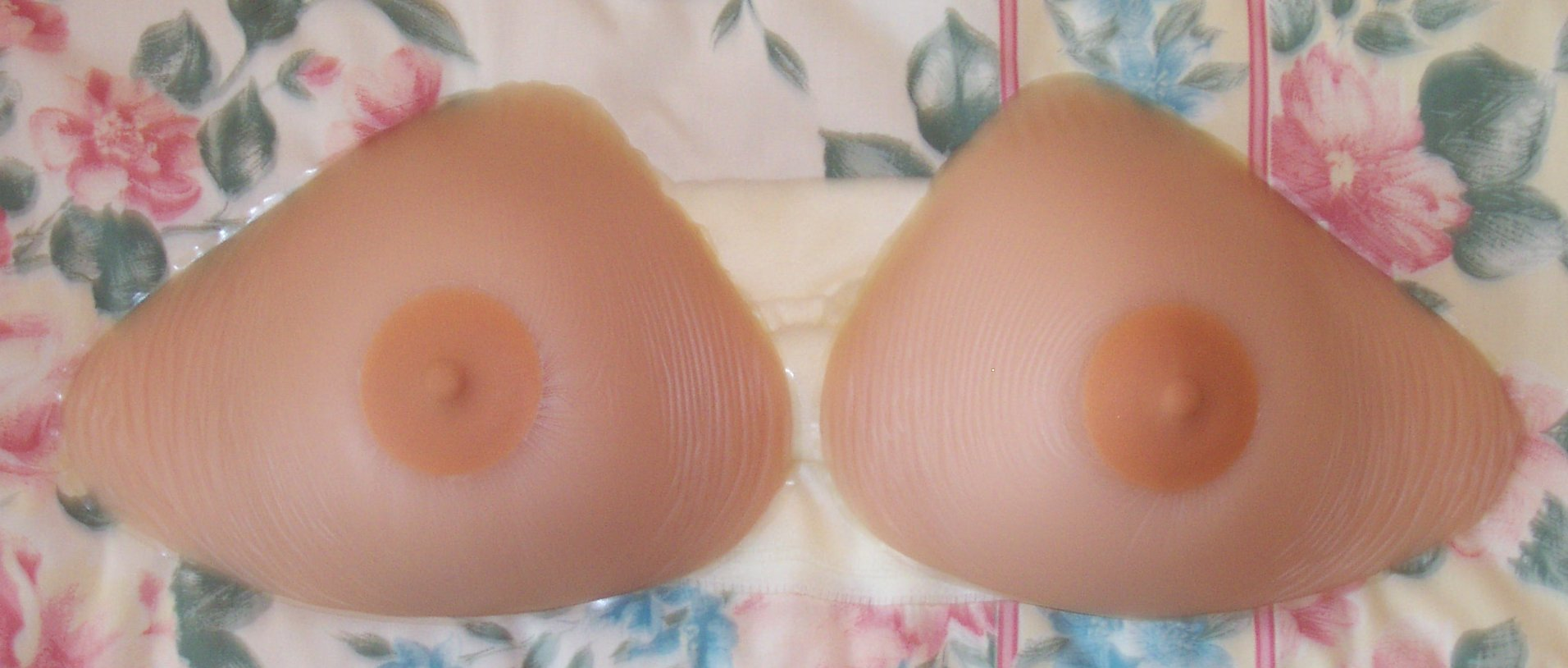
Breast prostheses used by some women after mastectomy

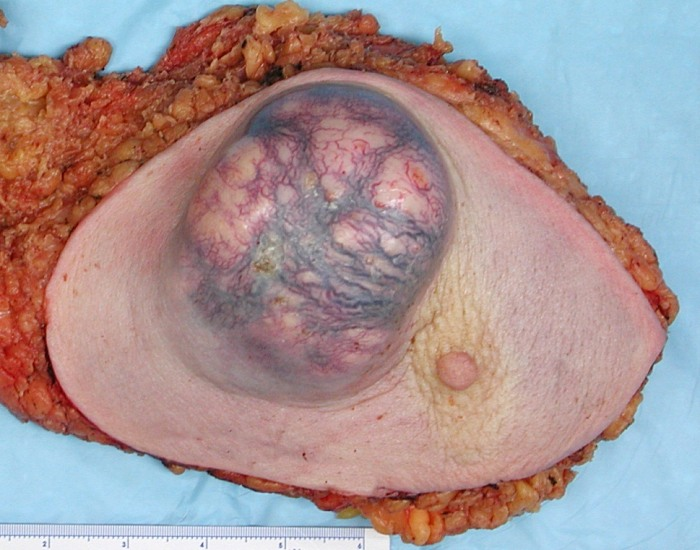
Mastectomy specimen containing a very large cancer of the breast (in this case, an invasive ductal carcinoma)

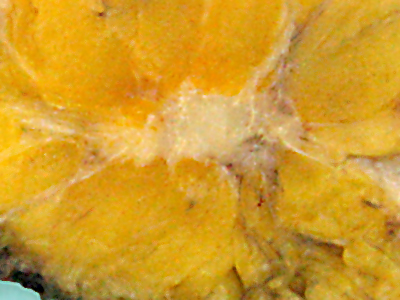
Typical macroscopic (gross examination) appearance of the cut surface of a mastectomy specimen containing cancer, in this case, an invasive ductal carcinoma of the breast, pale area at the center

== Perioperative procedures ==
=== Before surgery ===
Leading up to the day of the surgery, there are various considerations that patients can be cognizant of to facilitate their recovery following surgery. As with other surgeries that may lead to appreciable blood loss, it is advised not to take aspirin or aspirin-containing products for 10 days before the surgery. The reason for this is to prevent the anti-coagulative function of aspirin and other blood thinners that would make it difficult to achieve coagulation during the surgery. In addition, it is important for patients to tell the doctor about any medications, vitamins, or supplements that they are taking because some substances could interfere with the surgery. It is also pertinent for patients to not eat or drink 8 to 12 hours before surgery, however, there may be specific pre-operative instructions given by each patient's care team.

Maintaining fitness and proper nutrition is also an important measure to consider prior to receiving a surgery because it has been shown that postoperative outcomes are improved in patients that exercise and maintain a healthy diet prior to surgery. In addition to nutrition and exercise, it is advised to reduce alcohol consumption and smoking. This concept of pre-rehabilitation is beneficial in mitigating post-operative complications and decreasing length of stay in the hospital. The rationale is that increasing a patient's functional status prior to surgery will allow for a smoother and faster recovery in the postoperative setting.

Recent research has indicated that mammograms should not be done with any increased frequency than the normal procedure in women undergoing breast surgery, including breast augmentation, mastopexy, and breast reduction.

=== After surgery ===
Prior to leaving the hospital, people who have had a mastectomy will typically be given a prescription for pain medication to ameliorate any pain or discomfort at the surgery site. Recognizing signs of a surgical site infection including fever, redness, swelling, or pus is important. Any signs of infection should be reported to and assessed by a medical professional. In addition, signs of lymphedema due if lymph node removal is performed during mastectomy may be detected by the presence of heaviness, tightness, or fullness in the hand, arm, or axillary area region.

Regarding return to activity, it is advised not to engage in strenuous activity or lift objects above 5 pounds for up to six weeks after a mastectomy at the discretion of the physician. However, it is common for a member of the medical team to provide home exercises designed to maintain arm and shoulder movement and flexibility. Walking is also highly encouraged and allowed immediately after surgery. Most people who undergo a mastectomy can return to work and other regular physical activities in approximately 4 weeks after surgery.

People who have had a mastectomy will usually have a post-operative follow-up visit with their provider 1–2 weeks after surgery. The time at which a person can start to wear a bra or reconstructive breast varies and is often at the discretion of the physician.

Some people with breast cancer may require additional radiotherapy after their mastectomy procedure with the goal of reducing the risk of the cancer returning to the lymph nodes and the tissue remaining in the wall of the person's chest. The decision by the medical team for suggesting radiotherapy may differ between individual professionals. Most teams recommend radiotherapy after a mastectomy for people who are at a higher risk of cancer recurrence including those with large breast tumours (5 cm and larger) and people with cancer that has spread to multiple axillary lymph nodes (4 or more). The necessity and usefulness of radiotherapy on people at slightly lower risk, for example, the cancer has spread to 1-3 axillary lymph nodes, is not as clear.

== Trends ==
Between 2005 and 2013, the overall rate of mastectomy increased 36 percent, from 66 to 90 per 100,000 adult women. The rate of hospital-based bilateral mastectomies (inpatient and outpatient combined) more than tripled, from 9.1 to 29.7 per 100,000 adult women, whereas the rate of unilateral mastectomies remained relatively stable at around 60 per 100,000 women. From 2005 to 2013, the rate of bilateral outpatient mastectomies increased more than fivefold and the inpatient rate nearly tripled. The rate of unilateral mastectomies nearly doubled in the outpatient setting but decreased 28 percent in the inpatient setting. By 2013, nearly half of all mastectomies were performed outpatient. However, there are concerns that these rising rates of mastectomies are most greatly seen in women with node-negative and noninvasive lesions, which are subsets of patients that do not require mastectomy.

== Frequency ==
Mastectomy rates vary tremendously worldwide, as was documented by the 2004 "Intergroup Exemestane Study", an analysis of surgical techniques used in an international trial of adjuvant treatment among 4,700 females with early breast cancer in 37 countries. The mastectomy rate was highest in central and eastern Europe at 77%. The US had the second highest rate of mastectomy with 56%, western and northern Europe averaged 46%, southern Europe 42% and Australia and New Zealand 34%.

== History ==
Breast surgery was first described 3,000 years ago. In the earliest stages, breast tumors were treated with simple cauterization. Later, alternating incision and cauterization with complete removal of tumors was suggested by Leonides, one of the first breast oncologic surgeons recorded in history. Other surgeons recommended excision and cauterization only if the tumor could be removed completely; otherwise, avoiding surgery was recommended. Ambrose Pare (b. 1510), a well-known surgeon from Paris who was well known for his experience treating soldiers who were injured, proposed a multi-tiered approach to breast surgery. While superficial cancers could be excised, more advanced cancers were managed through compression by lead plates to reduce blood supply to the tumor.

In the 1500s, William Fabry (b. 1560), a German surgeon known as the father of German surgery, created a device that compressed and fixed the base of the breast during mastectomy, which subsequently allowed for faster excision of the breast. Another technique developed during this time to improve efficiency of breast dissection was using ligatures to achieve anterior traction. Despite the development of these techniques, there were few mastectomies actually performed at the time due to lack of qualified surgeons and the high morbidity, mortality and disfigurement associated with the surgery.

During the 1700s, large contributions in mapping lymph nodes for surgery were made by Pieter Camper (b. 1722) and Paolo Mascagni (b. 1752). Lymph node removal was advocated for managing breast cancer. At this time, surgeries were still performed without proper aseptics and without anesthesia.

In the 19th century, Seishu Hanaoka, a Japanese surgeon, performed the first surgery in the world under general anesthesia. Many more advancements in anesthesia and aseptic technique were made during this century. William Roentgen discovered x-rays in 1895, which radically shifted breast cancer treatment from a solely surgical approach to the multi-pronged approach employed today, including imaging, hormonal therapy, radiation, chemotherapy and immunotherapy.

During the 20th century, progress was made towards skin-sparing mastectomies for treatment of breast cancer. Recent literature suggests that these procedures allow for improved aesthetic outcomes while also not increasing risk for local recurrence compared to conventional mastectomies.

For example, in 1937, the Taunton State Hospital in Massachusetts reported 1 mastectomy in its operating rooms that year, listed alongside other operations.

== See also ==
- Breast-conserving surgery – Surgical operation
- Breast cancer management – Overview of current and historical management methods of breast cancer
- Medical tattoo – Type of tattooing
- Flat closure after mastectomy – Medical procedure
- List of surgeries by type
- Post-mastectomy pain syndrome
- Come un fiore
