= Lumpectomy =

Limited surgical removal of breast tissue

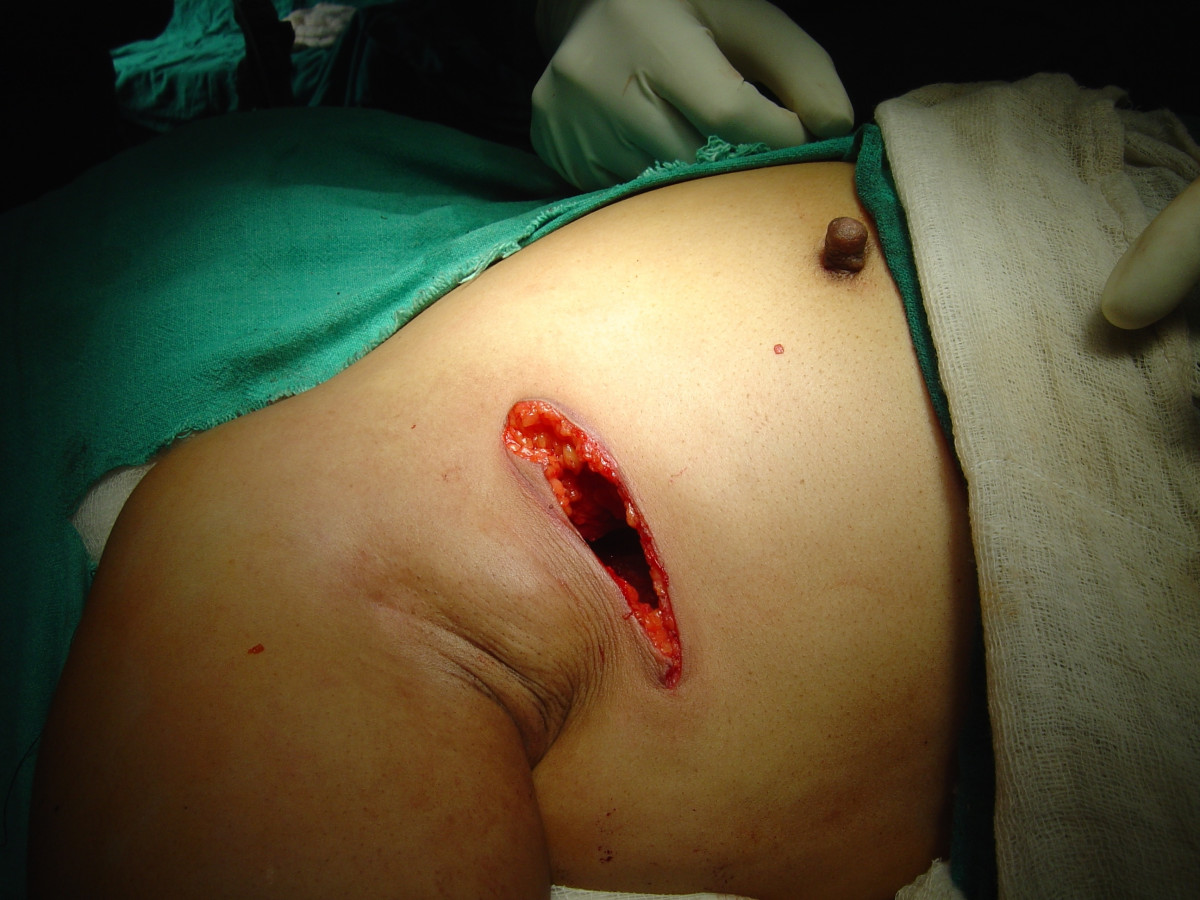
- Lumpectomy and axillary dissection performed through one incision
- Other names: Partial mastectomy
- ICD-9-CM: 85.21
- MeSH: D015412

Lumpectomy (sometimes known as a tylectomy, partial mastectomy, breast segmental resection or breast wide local excision) is a surgical removal of a discrete portion or "lump" of breast tissue, usually in the treatment of a malignant tumor or breast cancer. It is considered a viable breast conservation therapy, as the amount of tissue removed is limited compared to a full-breast mastectomy, and thus may have physical and emotional advantages over more disfiguring treatment. Sometimes a lumpectomy may be used to either confirm or rule out that cancer has actually been detected. A lumpectomy is usually recommended to patients whose cancer has been detected early and who do not have enlarged tumors. Although a lumpectomy is used to allow for most of the breast to remain intact, the procedure may result in adverse affects that can include sensitivity and result in scar tissue, pain, and possible disfiguration of the breast if the lump taken out is significant. According to National Comprehensive Cancer Network guidelines, lumpectomy may be performed for ductal carcinoma in situ (DCIS), invasive ductal carcinoma, or other conditions.

== Examples of cancers treated ==
DCIS, or intraductal carcinoma, is by definition a breast cancer that is limited to the lining of the milk ducts, and accounts for about 20% of breast cancer in the US. Although early treatment of DCIS was similar to invasive breast cancer, involving full mastectomy and sometimes lymph node dissection, an evolution in understanding about the different kinds of breast cancer prompted investigations into the adequacy of less extreme surgical treatments. The results of an eight-year randomized clinical trial in the late 1980s showed that, although lumpectomy alone was associated with significant recurrence, lumpectomy with local radiation therapy achieved similar outcomes to total mastectomy in treatment of DCIS. This was the first substantial data that showed that so-called "breast conserving therapy" was a real possibility.

After a lumpectomy is performed for DCIS, local radiation therapy is typically performed to help eliminate microscopic-level disease. Axillary sentinel lymph node biopsy, as a method of screening for metastatic disease in otherwise non-invasive DCIS, is falling out of favor because the risks of procedure outweigh any effect on outcomes. For DCIS, chemotherapy is not recommended, but tamoxifen may be recommended for tumors which contain an abundance of estrogen receptors.

For patients with invasive ductal carcinoma who have lumpectomies, lymph node biopsy and radiation therapy are usually recommended. Adjuvant chemotherapy is often recommended, but it may not be recommended if the tumor is small and there are no lymph node metastases. For larger tumors, neoadjuvant chemotherapy may be recommended.

== Procedure ==
A lumpectomy is a surgery to remove a breast tumor along with a resection margin of normal breast tissue. The margin is the healthy, noncancerous tissue that is next to the tumor. A pathologist analyzes the margin excised by the lumpectomy to detect any possible cancer cells. A cancerous margin is "positive", while a healthy margin is "clean" or "negative". A re-excision lumpectomy is performed if the margin is detected to be positive or cancerous cells are very close to the margin. Sentinel lymph node biopsy (SLNB) or axillary lymph node dissection (ALND) may be used to determine if the cancer has progressed away from the breast and into other parts of the body. Sentinel lymph node biopsy is the analysis of a few removed sentinel nodes for the presence of cancerous cells. A radioactive substance is used to dye the sentinel nodes for easy identification and removal. If cancer is detected in the sentinel node then further treatment is needed. Axillary node dissection involves the excision of lymph nodes connected to the tumor by the armpit (axilla). Radiation is usually used in conjunction with the lumpectomy to prevent recurrence. The radiation treatment can last five to seven weeks following the lumpectomy. Although the lumpectomy with radiation helps to decrease the risk of the cancer returning (local recurrence); it does not prolong survival; it is not a cure, and cancer may still come back. However, local recurrences (confined to the breast area) after lumpectomy can be treated effectively with mastectomy, and these women were still disease-free 20 years after their original lumpectomies and recurrence treatments.

== See also ==
- List of surgeries by type
- Bernard Fisher (scientist)
