= Papillary carcinomas of the breast =

Rare forms of the breast cancer

- Other names: Malignant papillary carcinomas of the breast
- Specialty: Breast pathology, Medical oncology, Surgical oncology
- Usual onset: Primarily middle aged and older females and, uncommonly, males
- Types: Papillary ductal carcinoma in situ; Encapsulated papillary carcinoma; Solid-papillary carcinoma; Invasive papillary carcinoma
- Causes: Unknown
- Prognosis: excellent
- Frequency: rare
- Deaths: rare

Papillary carcinomas of the breast (PCB), also termed malignant papillary carcinomas of the breast, are rare forms of the breast cancers. The World Health Organization (2019) classified papillary neoplasms (i.e. benign or cancerous tumors) of the breast into 5 types: intraductal papilloma, papillary ductal carcinoma in situ (PDCIS), encapsulated papillary carcinoma (EPC), solid-papillary carcinoma (SPC), and invasive papillary carcinoma (IPC). The latter four carcinomas are considered here; intraductal papilloma is a benign neoplasm. The World Health Organization regarded solid papillary carcinoma as having two subtypes: in situ and invasive SPC.

PCB develop from the epithelial cells that line the outer surfaces of ducts leading from exocrine glands or organs, blood vessels, or inner surfaces of the cavities in many internal organs. PCB are carcinomas derived from the epithelial cells of mammary gland ducts. They are a clinically, histologically, and biologically heterogeneous group of breast cancers that are often difficult to distinguish from each other as well as from other papillary breast lesions. The identification of PBS tumors may require the input of breast pathologists familiar with papillary lesions of the breast.

The four types of PCB are defined and diagnosed in part by several of their microscopic features including: 1) the presence of tumor invasion into adjacent normal tissues; 2) the presence and location of myoepithelial cells, i.e. cells that normally rest on the basement membrane of mammary gland ducts and function to contract and thereby expel milk from mammary glands (these cells are identified by immunohistochemistry staining tumor tissue with, e.g. cytokeratin 5/6 antibodies that detect two markers of myoepithelial cells, cytokeratin 5 and keratin 6A); 3) the presence of a thick fibrous capsule enclosing the carcinoma; 4) the presence of areas of neuroendocrine differentiation, i.e. sites of accumulated neoplastic cells with features combining those of nerve and hormone-producing cells including in particular the presence of neurosecretory granules, i.e. cytoplasmic granules about 180 nanometers in diameter that are found in neurons and secretory cells; and 5) the presence of signet ring-shaped cells bearing mucin-containing granules.

== Papillary ductal carcinoma in situ ==
=== Presentation ===
Information on the frequency and clinical features of PDCIS is limited since it and EPC were regarded as the same lesion termed intracystic papillary carcinoma until 2012. PDCIS is usually a small symptomless tumor that occurs in postmenopausal women. It is often first detected on routine screening mammography which shows microcalcifications (i.e. tiny deposits of calcium salts too small to be felt) or nodular densities. Rare cases of PDCIS have presented with a bloody nipple discharge. Males have presented with PDCIS: in one institutional review, 51 men aged 19 to 88 years were diagnosed with PDCIS; two of these men had gynecomastia. It is the most common type of ductal carcinoma in situ diagnosed in men. PDCIS tumors may occur alongside of (non-papillary) ductal carcinoma in situ or EPC tumors.

=== Pathology ===
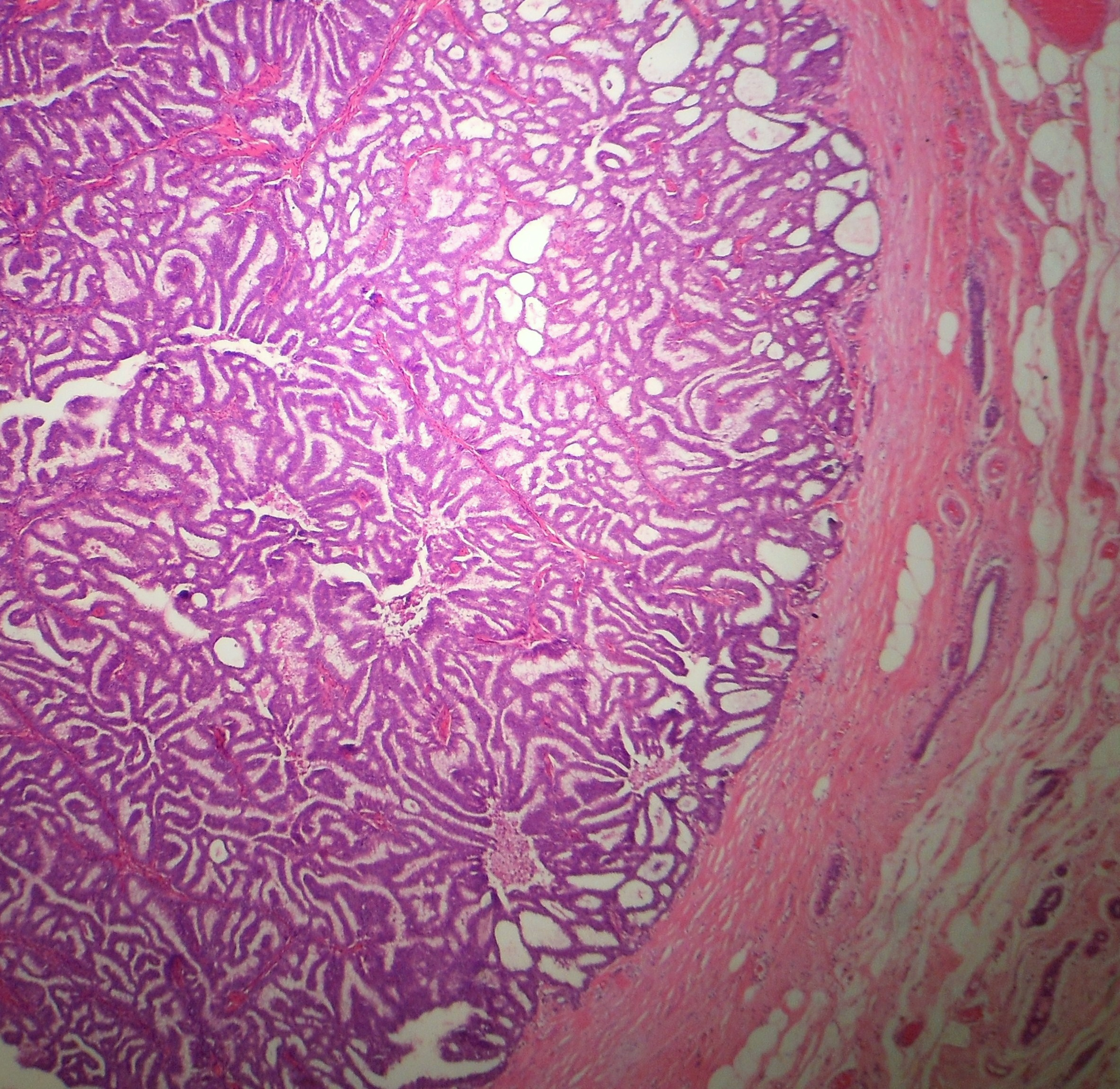
Papillary ductal carcinoma in situ

The microscopic histopathology of typical PDCIS lesions (refer to adjacent high-power photomicrograph) prepared with a hematoxylin and eosin stain consists of mammary ducts that have papillary fronds (i.e. thin, finger-like or leaf-like structures) lined with one or several layers of neoplastic, columnar-shaped epithelial cells (i.e. tall, narrow cells with their nuclei close to the site of their ductal attachment). The fronds have branching fibrovascular cores. Epithelial cells lining the fronds' inner surfaces commonly form solid, cribriform (i.e. large nests of cells perforated by many rounded, variably sized spaces), or micro-papillary patterns. There may be a second population of epithelial cells lining the papillae that have abundant clear cytoplasm in addition to the usual neoplastic epithelial cells which line the papillae. These cells, which are not myoepithelial cells, have been termed globoid cells. They have eosinophilic cytoplasm (i.e. pink or red cytoplasm due to its uptake of eosin stain). PDCIS tumors with these cells have been termed dimorphic variants of PDCIS. Myoepithelial cells are typically present at the periphery of the fronds but absent within the involved ducts. The presence of a fibrous capsule and/or absence of peripherally located myoepithelial cells are strong indicators that the tumor is an ESP rather than a PDCIS. PDCIS tissues may also contain areas of "Comedo-type necrosis", i.e. areas where dead cells have accumulated.

An Immunohistochemical study conducted in 2009 of 54 individuals diagnosed with PDCIS found that the tumor cells in 34, 31, and 35 cases, respectively, expressed the estrogen receptor, progesterone receptor, and HER2/neu protein. More resent reports find that these tumor cells strongly express the estrogen receptor in most cases and that PDCIS with tumor cells that do not express the estrogen receptor generally have a more malignant microscopic histopathology. While there are no specific gene alterations that have been repeatedly found in PDCIS tumor cells, the isolated cases in which they have been found were alterations similar to those occurring in low grade ductal carcinoma in situ tumors.

=== Treatment and prognosis ===
PDCIS is managed primarily by surgical removal in the same manner as ductal carcinoma in situ tumors that have the same nuclear grade and estrogen receptor expression by their tumor cells (see treatment of ductal carcinoma in situ). (Nuclear grade describes how closely the nuclei of cancer cells look like the nuclei of normal breast cells; the higher the nuclear grade, the more abnormal appearing the nuclei are and the more aggressive the tumor cells tend to be.) PDCIS has an excellent prognosis with long-term survival rates similar to those for EPC.

== Encapsulated papillary carcinoma ==
=== Presentation ===
EPC, previously grouped with PDCIS and termed intracystic papillary carcinoma, occurs primarily in postmenopausal females. In one large study, individuals diagnosed with EPC ranged from 30 to 93 years old (median age: 69 years) with 2% of the cases being diagnosed in men. A large institutional review recorded 14 men aged 55 to 82 years with EPC. EPC usually present as small (e.g., 0.3 to 9 centimeters), palpable masses located underneath the areola (i.e. pigmented area surrounding the breast's nipple); at presentation, 5 to 20% have a nipple discharge which may be bloody. Sonography examinations usually detect round to oval, circumscribed masses that may have a cystic component. Recently, EPC tumors have more often presented in women as symptomless masses first detected by routine mammography screening. In rare cases, individuals who present with what appear to be either in situ or invasive EPC have been found on further examination to have metastases in their nearby axillary (i.e. armpit) sentinel lymph nodes, other axillary lymph nodes, and/or distant tissues.

=== Pathology ===
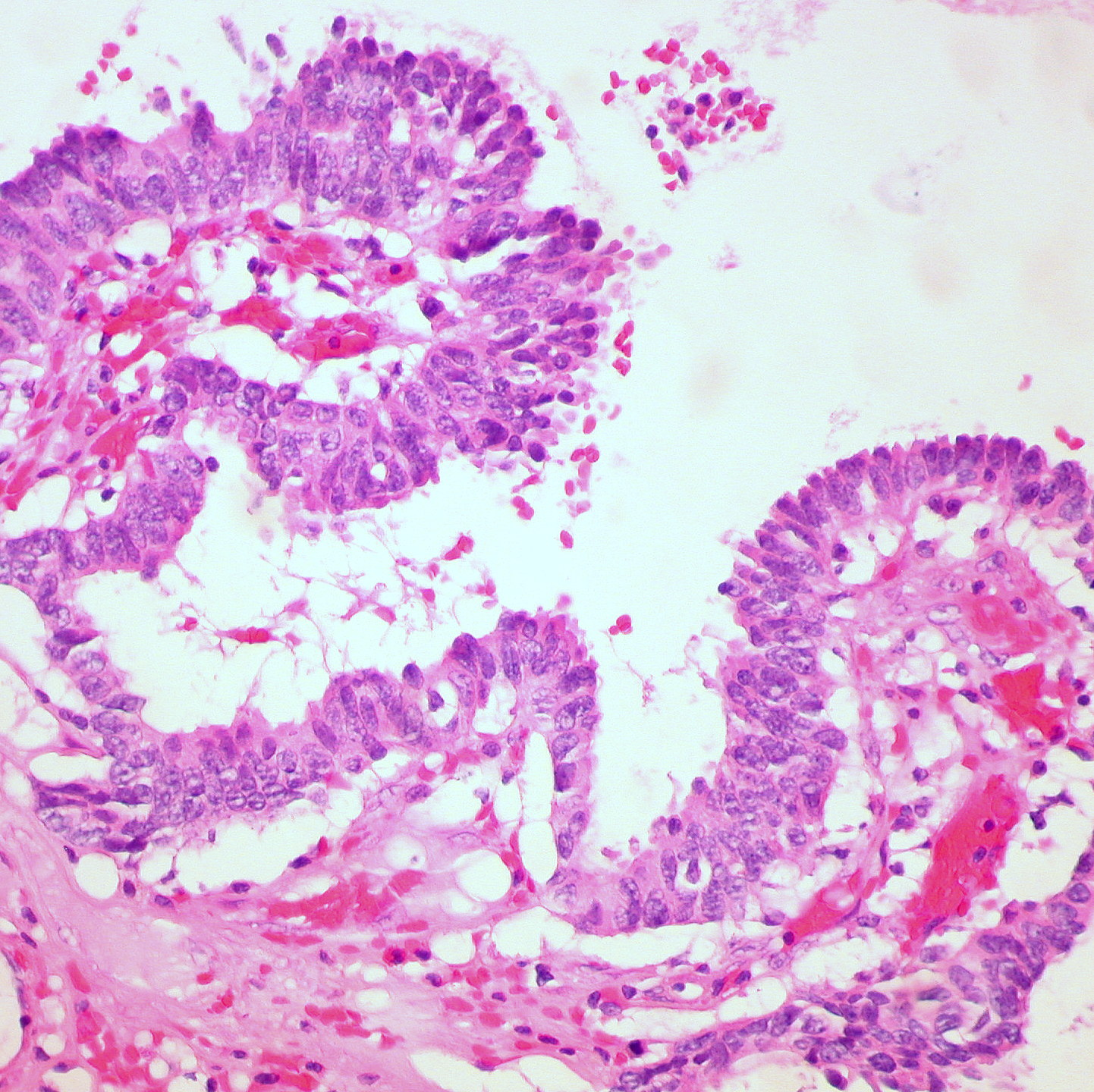
Encapsulated Papillary Carcinoma

The microscopic histopathology (refer to adjacent high-power photomicrograph) of EPC tissues typically shows papillary structures with fibrovascular cores and proliferating neoplastic epithelial cells growing within cystic spaces, all of which are enclosed within a dense fibrous capsule. In general, EPC tumors do not have areas of neuroendocrine degeneration or myoepithelial cells. The presence of a dense fibrous capsule distinguishes EPC from other papillary breast tumors, particularly PDCIS; the absence of neuroendocrine differentiation areas helps distinguishes EPC from SPC tumors; and the absence of peripherally located myoepithelial cells helps distinguish EPC from PDCIS tumors. EPC tumors may be totally contained within their fibrous capsules or have one or more areas that have invaded through the capsule to normal breast tissues and/or chest muscles; these two variants are termed in situ EPC and infiltrative EPC, respectively. In a study of 25 individuals with EPC, 14 had in situ and 11 had invasive disease with 6 of the invasive tumors rated as high grade (see high grade tumors) based on their microscopic histopathology. Rarely, EPC tumors metastasize to nearby sentinel lymph nodes, other nearby axillary lymph nodes, and/or distant tissues; these metastases have in general shown papillary morphologic features similar to their primary tumors. Uncommonly, EPC tumors co-exists with nearby PDCIS, invasive carcinoma of no special type, invasive cribriform carcinoma of the breast, mucinous carcinoma, or tubular carcinoma tumors.

Immunohistochemical analyses of the tumors cells in most individuals with EPC find strong expression of estrogen and progesterone receptors but not HER2/neu protein. A clinicopathologic study of 49 EPC cases found that 47 cases had tumor cells that expressed estrogen and progesterone receptors while only 8 had tumor cells that expressed HER2/neu protein. However, individuals with a more malignant EPC tumor as determined by microscopic histopathology analyses (about 5%–10% of all cases) often had tumor cells that are triple negative, i.e. do not express estrogen receptors, progesterone receptors, or HER2/neu protein. Gene analyses studies have reported that EPS tumor cells in some individuals have copy number variations such as loses of genetic material in the q (i.e. long) arm of chromosome 16, gains of genetic material in the p (or short) arm of chromosome 16, and gains of genetic material in the q arm of chromosome 1. Studies have also identified individuals with EPS tumors that have hot spot mutations (i.e. disease-causing mutations) in the PIK3CA gene which, when having activating mutations, may promote the development and/or progression of breast and other cancers. Recurrent alterations in two genes involved with chromatin remodeling (i.e. modifying chromatin architecture), KMT2A and CREBBP, have also been identified in the tumor cells of some EPS cases. Alterations in these two genes are, similar to alterations in the PIK3CA gene, associated with the development and/or progression of breast and other cancers.

=== Treatment and prognosis ===
In a study of 25 individuals with EPC, 14 had in situ and 11 had invasive disease with 6 of the invasive tumors rated as high grade based on their microscopic histopathology. Nonetheless, high and low grade tumors trended to have similar prognoses. Since other studies have found that 3 to 11.1% of EPC tumors had spread to nearby axillary lymph nodes at presentation, sentinel axillary lymph node biopsies have sometimes been added to surgical tumor removal with the goal of checking these lymph nodes for metastases which, if present, lead to do further studies such as medical imaging to look for distant metastases. However, studies have shown that the outcomes of in situ and invasive EPC are statically similar. Consequently, most studies have clinically staged and managed EPC tumors as in situ (i.e. neither invasive nor metastatic) breast carcinomas (see ductal carcinoma in situ). The most common treatment for EPC tumors has been complete surgical resection making sure that all tumor tissue is removed. Aggressive appearing EPC tumors (e.g. tumors extensively invading normal tissues, and/or with high-grade features plus triple-negative tumor cells,) and tumors that have spread to distant tissues have been treated with adjuvant (i.e. treatment in addition to the primary treatment which in this case is surgery) chemotherapy and/or radiotherapy. However, there is little data on the efficacy of these more aggressive treatments. Hormonal therapy (i.e. the estrogen receptor modulator drug, tamoxifen, or various aromatase inhibitors of the estrogen receptor) has been used as the primary or adjuvant therapy in individuals less than 50 years of age, unfit for surgical intervention, or with recurrent tumors. In a study of 49 patients conducted in Taiwan, 25 were treated by lumpectomy, 24 (22 of whom had invasive EPC) were treated by mastectomy, 7 received adjuvant radiation therapy, 3 received adjuvant chemotherapy, and 19 received adjuvant hormonal therapy. In a follow-up 8 to 104 months (mean: 47 months) after diagnoses of 29 cases, 5 developed recurrent disease 1.5 to 7 (mean: 3.3) years after diagnosis and 2 developed metastases, 1 to lung and 1 to bone. By the end of the study, 47 individuals had no evidence of disease and 2 had died of unknown causes. The study suggested adjuvant radiation and hormonal therapy may be useful for treating individuals with pure EPC. Overall, EPC tumors have prognoses similar to in situ breast carcinomas with 10-year survival rates approaching 100% and 10-year disease-free survivals approaching 91%.

== Solid-papillary carcinoma ==
=== Presentation ===
SPC commonly presents as a single, or in rare cases, multiple tumors sized 0.1 to 1.5 centimeter (cm.) in widest diameter. Two large literature review studies reported that these tumors occurred in middle-aged to older females aged 44 to 80 years and, far less commonly, men aged 41 to 88 years. In a large review of published cases, 5.8% of all individuals with SPC were diagnosed in premenopausal women as young as 30 years. These rumors are about equally likely to occur beneath the breast's areola or outside of this area and may have bloody nipple discharges. Mammography of non-invasive SPC generally shows round, circumscribed solid, well-defined masses while SPC with invasion may show a mass with irregular borders and/or architectural distortion. Although usually localized to breast tissue, 3% to 5% of SPC tumors spread to nearby lymph nodes and ~2.8% metastasize to distant tissues. Also in rare cases, SPC tumors have been associated with nearby concurrent invasive carcinoma of no special type tumors. Individual cases of SPC tumors have been reported to recur at their site of surgical removal or metastasize to distant tissues such as the lung.

=== Pathology ===
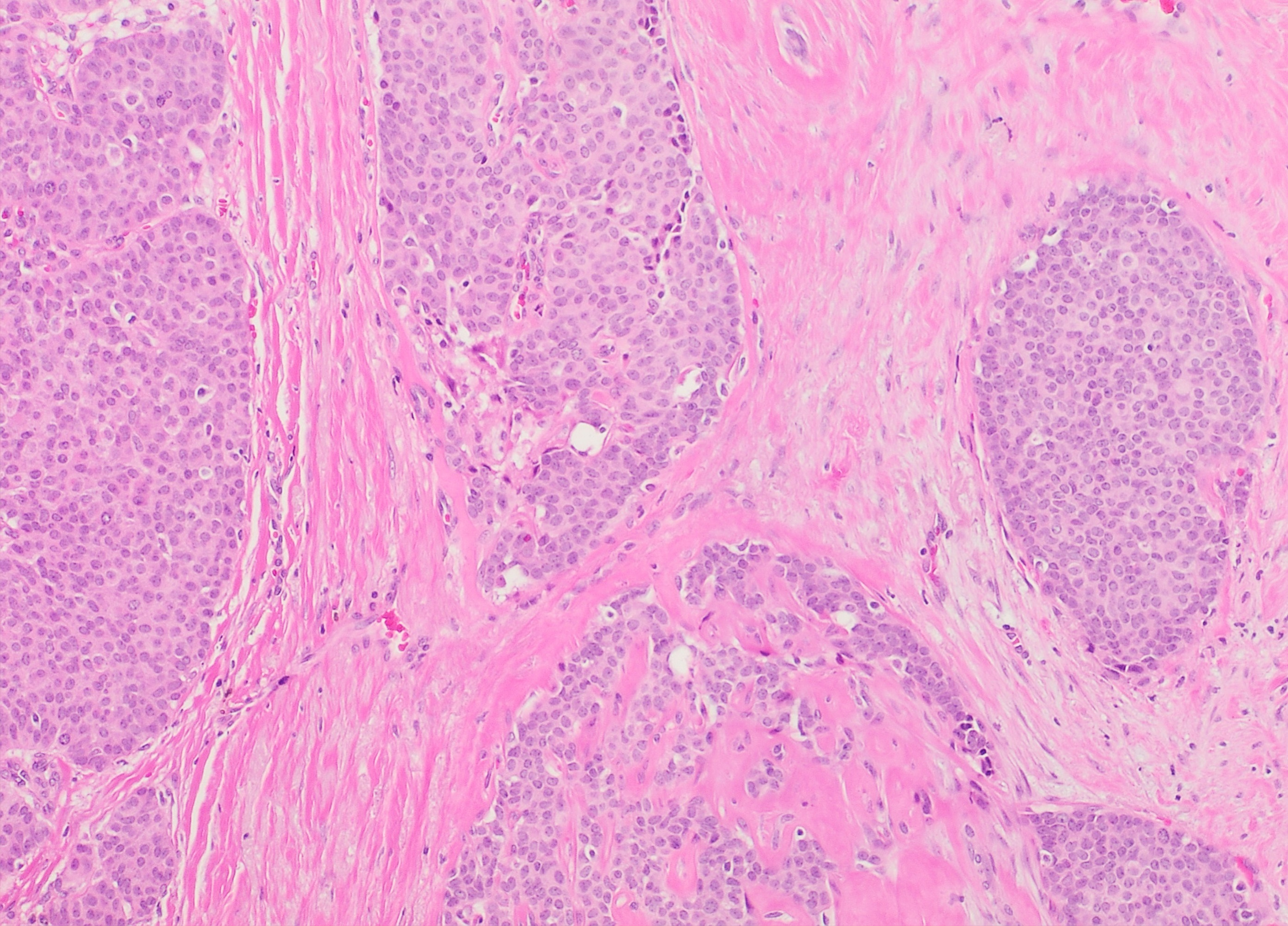
Histopathology of solid papillary carcinoma, H&E stain, showing large nests with solid sheets of tumor cells with (in this case variable amount of) fibrovascular cores.

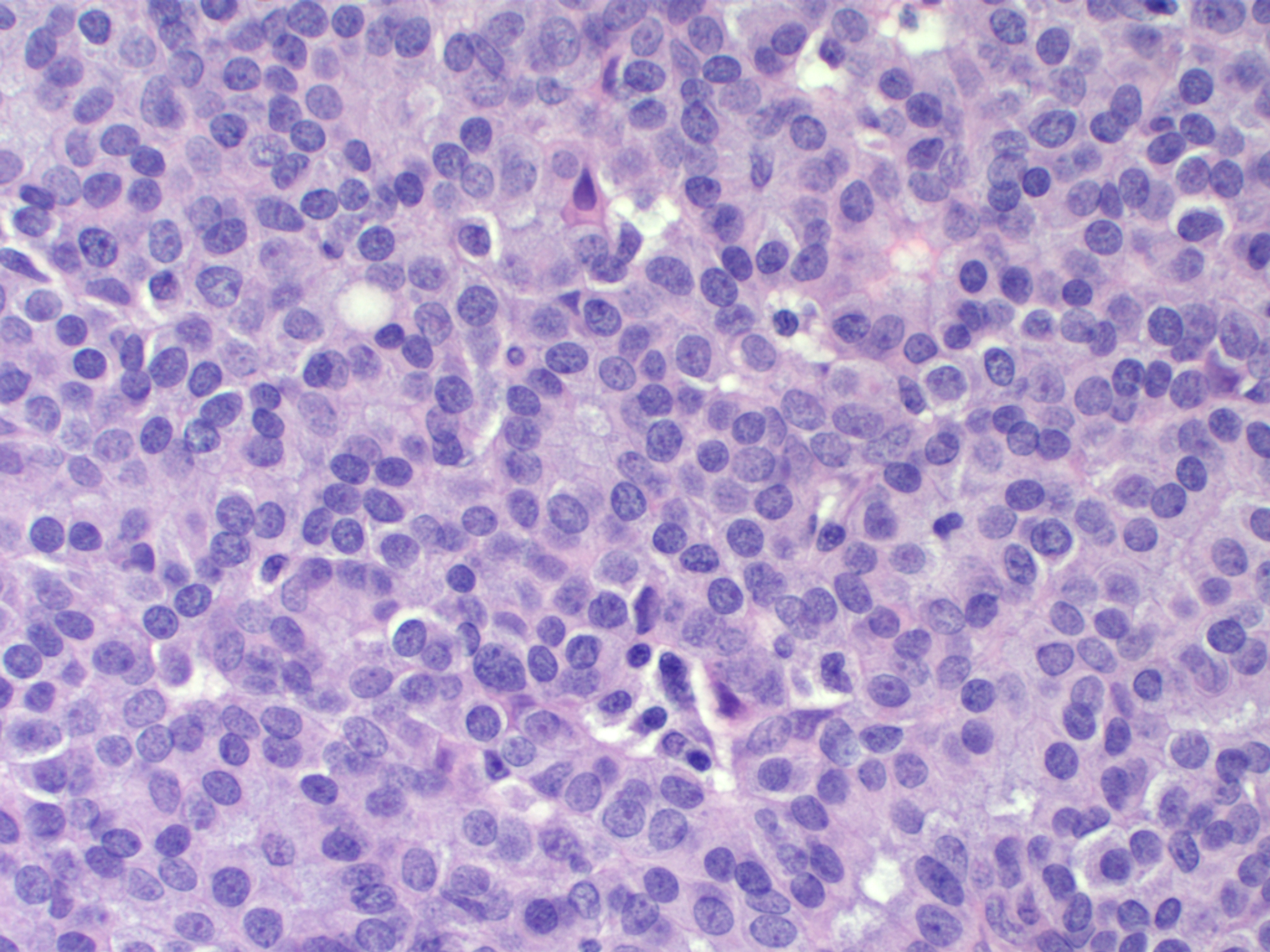
Solid papillary carcinoma

Microscopic histopathological analyses of SPC lesions (refer to adjacent high-power photomicrograph) generally show tumors with multiple circumscribed nodules of expanded ducts filled with neoplastic epithelial cells which may appear spindle-shaped or plasma cell-like, have red to pink cytoplasm due to the uptake of eosin after staining with hematoxilin & eosin, and eccentrically-placed nuclei. Rarely, signet ring-shaped cells are present. The tumors may have cystic and hemorrhagic areas. Myoepithelial cells are found within and at the periphery of these tumors. The papillary architecture seen in the other SCB types is in general not apparent; rather, pseudo-rosettes (i.e. radial arrangements of neoplastic cells around small blood vessel) and nuclear palisading (i.e. parallel arrangements of the nuclei in rows of tumors that resembles picket fences) around stromal cores (i.e. supporting tissues) may be seen. SPC tumor tissues typically (>50% of cases) have areas of neuroendocrine differentiation. The presence of these areas strongly supports the diagnosis of SPC. The signet ring-shaped cells in these tumors contain cytoplasmic mucin-containing vacuoles which push their cells' nuclei to one side. Mucin may also occur outside of cells in these lesions. The presence of signet ring-shaped cells bearing mucin-containing vacuoles with or without extracellular mucin strongly supports the diagnosis of SPC. SPC is considered invasive when the tumor nests have a characteristic jigsaw growth pattern with ragged and irregular margins with the loss of myoepithelial cells at the site(s) of invasion. Rarely, invasive SPC occurs with nearby invasive carcinoma of NST, lobular carcinoma, cribriform carcinoma, or tubular carcinoma breast tumors.

Immunohistochemcal analyses find that most cases of SPC have tumor cells that express the estrogen and progesterone receptors but not HER2/neu protein. Gene analysis studies find molecular alterations in the SPC tumor cells of some individuals. These include loses in the long arm of chromosome 16q, loses in the short arm of chromosome 16, gains in the long arm of chromosome 1, mutations in the PIK3CA gene (~40% of cases), and the expression of neuroendocrine differentiation-related proteins such as the GDNF family of ligand proteins encoded by the RET proto-oncogene gene, ASCL1 protein encoded by the ASCL1 gene, Dok-7 protein encoded by the DOK7 gene, enolase 2 encoded by the ENOL2 gene, synaptophysin encoded by the SYP gene, and chromogranin A and chromogranin B encoded respectively by the CHGA and CHGB genes.

=== Treatment and prognosis ===
The best treatments for SPC have not been well-defined. Among 265 published cases of SPC, recurrent tumors occurred in 2 cases, recurrent invasive tumors occurred in 9 cases, lymph node metastases occurred in 5 cases, and distant tissue metastasis occurred in 9 cases; the metastases occurred only in the 135 individuals with invasive SPC. As of 2020, only 3 deaths had been reported due to SPC. Since almost all cases of SPC have an excellent prognosis, SPC tumors have been treated with breast-conserving surgery (e.g. lumpectomy) or mastectomy depending upon the extent of the tumors' invasive components. Adjuvant chemotherapy (e.g. an orally taken preparation of the chemotherapeutic drug, 5-Fluorouracil,) and/or hormonal therapy (tamoxifen or an agonist of gonadotropin-releasing hormone) have been used to treat the more aggressive, e.g. metastasizing, SPC tumors.

== Invasive papillary carcinoma ==
=== Presentation ===
In a retrospective study of 1,147 females with IPC: 1) 46.8% were 70–90 years old while only 8.0% were 40–49 years old; 2) 74.6% were defined as white, 17.9 as black, and 5.6% as other races (1.8% were race unknown; 3) 61.1% had tumor sizes <2 centimeters (cm.), 25.9% had tumor sizes 2–5 cm., and 12.3% had tumor sizes >5 cm. in widest dimension (0.7% had no information on tumor size); 4) 76.5% had no and 12.8% had metastases in their axillary lymph nodes (10.6% had no information on metastases) and 5) no cases had metastases to distant tissues. A study of 8 men aged 49 to 88 years diagnosed with IPC tumors likewise reported than none of them had metastases to distant tissues. IPC tumors typically are first noted because of a bloody nipple discharge, a palpable breast mass, and/or routine radiographic screening that detects abnormalities such as a round, oval, or lobulated mass found on mammography.

=== Pathology ===
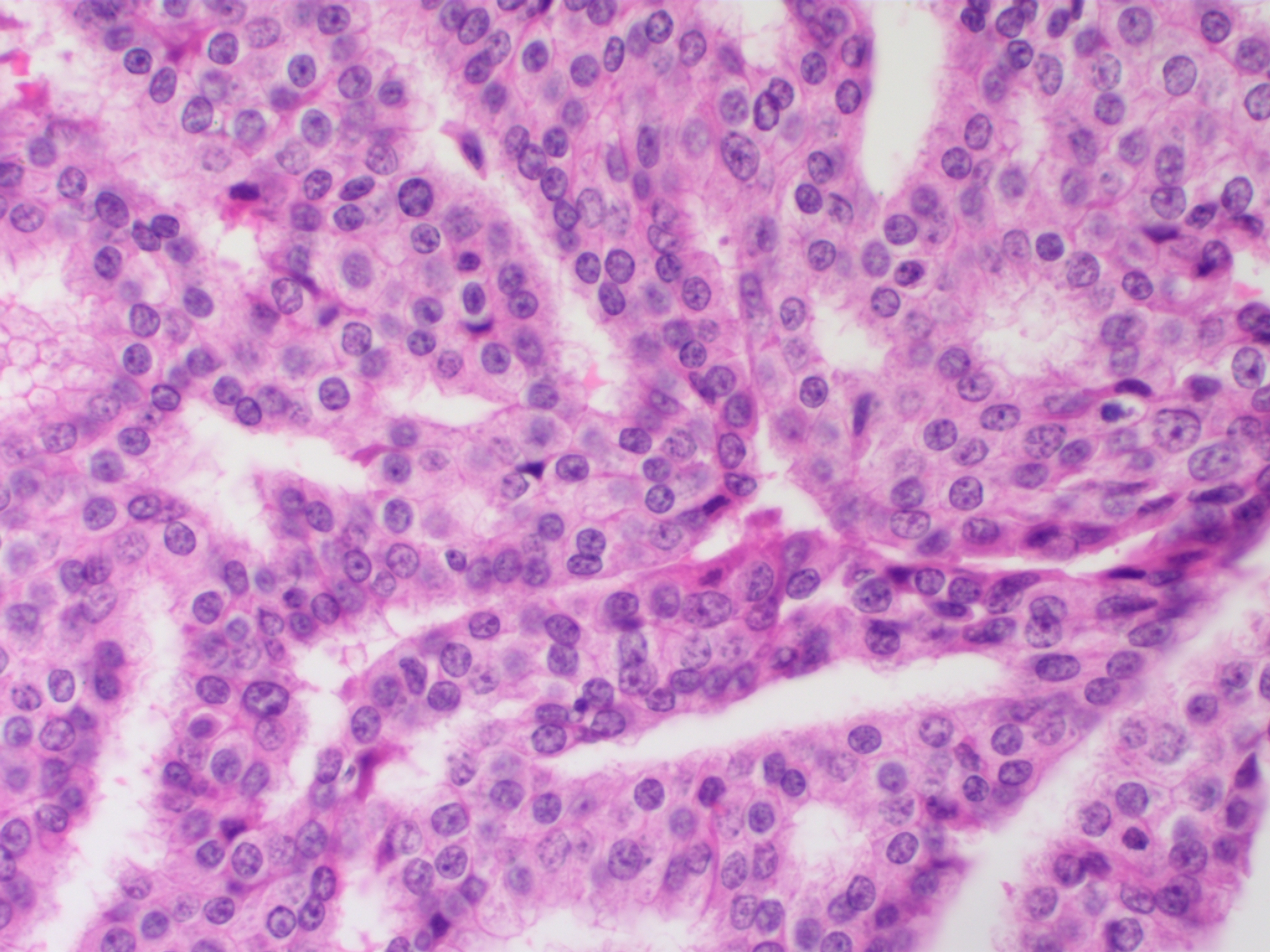
Invasive papillary carcinoma

Since many of the earlier published cases of IPC actually appear to be variants of invasive EPC or SPC, there is little consistent pathological data on IPC. Studies on the microscopic histopathology of IPC have reported finding (refer to the adjacent high-power photomicrograph): 1) blunt papillae or ductal structures consisting of neoplastic epithelial cells surrounding a fibrovascular core; 2) papillae located in dilated ducts and variably sized microcysts plus foci of necrosis (i.e. dead cells); 3) tumors totally dominated by fibrovascular cores covered with neoplastic epithelium cells; and 4) tumors showing >90% papillary morphology invading nearby breast tissue and/or sub-mammary chest muscles. Studies do agree that IPC tumors have, by definition, one or more sites that have invaded nearby breast and/or muscle tissue, lack myoepithelial cells at their invasion sites, and generally lack a peripheral fibrous capsule; these features are important for diagnosing IPC. Rarely, ductal carcinoma in situ lesions are present near IPC. A retrospective histopathological analysis of the tumor tissues in 1,147 individuals with IPC reported that 89.3%, 83.4%, and 2.4% of the cases had tumor cells which respectively expressed the estrogen receptor, progesterone receptor, and HER2/neu protein (however, 46.4% of the cases were not tested for the HER2/neu). In a second histopathological study of 44 individuals diagnosed with IPC, 72.7% had tumor cells that expressed the estrogen receptor, 72.7% had tumor cells that expressed the progesterone receptor, and 13.6% had tumor cells that expressed the HER2/Neu protein. No specific genetic alterations have been as yet been clearly associated with the tumor cells in individuals diagnosed with IPC.

=== Treatment and prognosis ===
IPC tumors have most commonly been treated with lumpectomies or mastectomies plus adjuvant radiation therapy, chemotherapy, and/or hormonal therapy. A review of 10,485 individuals all of whom had early stage N1 (<2 cm. in size) or N2 (2 to <5 cm. in size) IPC tumors that had not metastasized to lymph nodes or distant tissues reported that lumpectomy plus adjuvant radiation therapy produced significantly better mean survival times (16.8 years) than lumpectomy (14.2 years) or mastectomy (14.9 years) without this adjuvant treatment. A review of 1,147 IPC cases, which included individuals with T3 (i.e. tumor size >5 cm.) and axillary lymph node metastases (44.2% with no, 4.3% with, and 51.5% with unknown metastases) were treated with lumpectomy (68.2% of cases), mastectomy (31.1%), adjuvant radiation therapy (57.3), adjuvant chemotherapy (16.1%), or adjuvant or non-adjuvant endocrine therapy (64.0%); overall, these individuals had mean 5 year survival rate of 71.4%. Individuals with low-grade disease or who received adjuvant radiation therapy had significantly better 5 year survival rates. Further studies are needed to determine the efficacy of these various treatments as well other treatment regimens for IPC tumors.
