= C12H11NO5 =

The molecular formula C_{12}H_{11}NO_{5} (molar mass: 249.22 g/mol) may refer to:

- MS15203, or 5-Methacrylamidoisophthalic acid
- Macromomycin B
