= Granin (disambiguation) =

Granin is a family of proteins. Granin may also refer to

- Daniil Granin (1919–2017), Soviet novelist
- Aleksandr Leonovitch Granin, a character in Metal Gear Solid 3: Snake Eater
