= GPR171 =

Protein-coding gene in the species Homo sapiens

Identifiers
- Aliases: GPR171, H963, G protein-coupled receptor 171
- External IDs: MGI: 2442043; GeneCards: GPR171

Gene location (Human)
Chr.	Chromosome 3 (human)
Band	3q25.1	Start	151,197,832 bp
Band	3q25.1	End	151,203,216 bp

Gene location (Mouse)
Chr.	Chromosome 3 (mouse)
Band	3|3 D	Start	59,003,869 bp
Band	3|3 D	End	59,009,242 bp
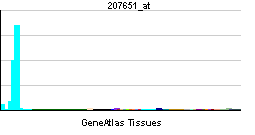
RNA expression pattern
Bgee	Human / Mouse (ortholog); Top expressed in: testicle; buccal mucosa cell; appendix; blood; lymph node; granulocyte; spleen; superficial temporal artery; amniotic fluid; gallbladder / Top expressed in: mesenteric lymph nodes; blood; spleen; thymus; morula; subcutaneous adipose tissue; embryo; embryo; blastocyst; bone marrow; More reference expression data
BioGPS	More reference expression data
Gene ontology
Molecular function	G protein-coupled purinergic nucleotide receptor activity; G protein-coupled receptor activity; signal transducer activity
Cellular component	integral component of membrane; plasma membrane; integral component of plasma membrane; membrane
Biological process	G protein-coupled receptor signaling pathway; negative regulation of myeloid cell differentiation; signal transduction; G protein-coupled purinergic nucleotide receptor signaling pathway
Sources:Amigo / QuickGO
Orthologs
Databases	NCBI: entry; OMA: entry
Species	Human	Mouse
Entrez	29909	229323
Ensembl	ENSG00000174946	ENSMUSG00000050075
UniProt	O14626	Q8BG55
RefSeq (mRNA)	NM_013308	NM_173398
RefSeq (protein)	NP_037440	NP_775574
Location (UCSC)	Chr 3: 151.2 – 151.2 Mb	Chr 3: 59 – 59.01 Mb
PubMed search
- Wikidata
View/Edit Human	View/Edit Mouse

G-protein coupled receptor 171 is a protein that in humans is encoded by the GPR171 gene. It has been recently deorphanised, with its endogenous agonist being a neuropeptide BigLEN which is a cleavage product of proSAAS. GPR174 has been found to be involved in processes such as pain, anxiety, and appetite regulation, as well as immune system function, and GPR174 agonists may represent a potential target for novel analgesic drugs. It seems to show sex-selective signalling, with effects seen in male mice often absent in female mice.

== Ligands ==
Agonists

- BigLEN
- MS15203
