= Granin =

Protein family

Granin (chromogranin or secretogranin)
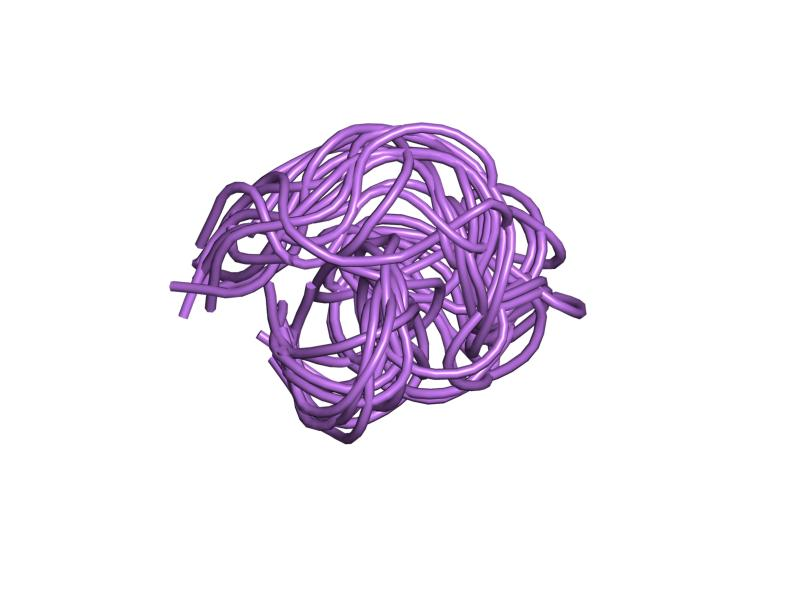
- Structure of SS-cyclized catestatin fragment from chromogranin A.

Identifiers
- Symbol: Granin
- Pfam: PF01271
- InterPro: IPR001990
- PROSITE: PDOC00365
- SCOP2: 1cfk / SCOPe / SUPFAM
- OPM superfamily: 282
- OPM protein: 1lv4
Available protein structures:
- PDB: IPR001990 PF01271 (ECOD; PDBsum)
- AlphaFold: IPR001990; PF01271

Granin (chromogranin and secretogranin) is a protein family of regulated secretory proteins ubiquitously found in the cores of amine and peptide hormone and neurotransmitter dense-core secretory vesicles.

== Function ==
Granins (chromogranins or secretogranins) are acidic proteins and are present in the secretory granules of a wide variety of endocrine and neuro-endocrine cells. The exact function(s) of these proteins is not yet settled but there is evidence that granins function as pro-hormones, giving rise to an array of peptide fragments for which autocrine, paracrine, and endocrine activities have been demonstrated in vitro and in vivo. The intracellular biochemistry of granins includes binding of Ca^{2+}, ATP and catecholamines (epinephrine, norepinephrine) within the hormone storage vesicle core. There is also evidence that CgA, and perhaps other granins, regulate the biogenesis of dense-core secretory vesicles and hormone sequestration in neuroendocrine cells.

== Structure ==
Apart from their subcellular location and the abundance of acidic residues (Asp and Glu), these proteins do not share many structural similarities. Only one short region, located in the C-terminal section, is conserved in all these proteins. Chromogranins and secretogranins together share a C-terminal motif, whereas chromogranins A and B share a region of high similarity in their N-terminal section; this region includes two cysteine residues involved in a disulfide bond.

There are considerable differences in the amino acid composition between different animals. Commercial assays for measuring human CGA can usually not be used for measuring CGA in samples from other species. Some specific parts of the molecule have a higher degree of amino acid homology and methods where the antibodies are directed against specific epitopes can be used to measure samples from different animals. Region-specific assays measuring defined parts of CGA, CGB and SG2 can be used for measurements in samples from cats and dogs.

== Members ==
=== Chromogranins ===
- chromogranin A (CgA)
- chromogranin B (CgB)

chromogranin A (parathyroid secretory protein 1)

Identifiers
- Symbol: CHGA
- Alt. symbols: CGA
- NCBI gene: 1113
- HGNC: 1929
- OMIM: 118910
- RefSeq: NM_001275
- UniProt: P10645

Other data
- Locus: Chr. 14 q32
Search for
- Structures: Swiss-model
- Domains: InterPro

chromogranin B (secretogranin 1)

Identifiers
- Symbol: CHGB
- Alt. symbols: SCG1
- NCBI gene: 1114
- HGNC: 1930
- OMIM: 118920
- RefSeq: NM_001819
- UniProt: P05060

Other data
- Locus: Chr. 20 pter-p12
Search for
- Structures: Swiss-model
- Domains: InterPro

=== Secretogranins ===
- secretogranin II (SgII) (see also secretoneurin)
- secretogranin III (SgIII)
- secretogranin V (SgV)

secretogranin II (chromogranin C)

Identifiers
- Symbol: SCG2
- Alt. symbols: CHGC, SgII
- NCBI gene: 7857
- HGNC: 10575
- OMIM: 118930
- RefSeq: NM_003469
- UniProt: P13521

Other data
- Locus: Chr. 2 q35-q36
Search for
- Structures: Swiss-model
- Domains: InterPro

secretogranin III (FLJ90833)

Identifiers
- Symbol: SCG3
- Alt. symbols: SGIII
- NCBI gene: 29106
- HGNC: 13707
- OMIM: 611796
- RefSeq: NM_013243
- UniProt: Q8WXD2

Other data
- Locus: Chr. 15 q21.3
Search for
- Structures: Swiss-model
- Domains: InterPro

secretogranin V (7B2 protein)

Identifiers
- Symbol: SCG5
- Alt. symbols: SGNE1
- NCBI gene: 6447
- HGNC: 10816
- OMIM: 173120
- RefSeq: NM_003020
- UniProt: P05408

Other data
- Locus: Chr. 15 q13-q14
Search for
- Structures: Swiss-model
- Domains: InterPro

=== Extended group ===
Some other proteins are also proposed to belong to the granins based on their physico-chemical properties. These include NESP55 (SgVI), VGF (SgVII), and ProSAAS (SgVIII).
