= Secretoneurin =

Secretoneurin, is a 33-amino acid neuropeptide derived from secretogranin II (chromogranin C, CHGC).

== Function ==
Secretoneurin is involved in chemotaxis of monocytes and eosinophils (comparable in potency to interleukin 8) and endothelial cells and in regulation of endothelial cell proliferation. Highest secretoneurin levels are found in anterior pituitary, followed by adrenal medulla and posterior pituitary hypothalamus (2- to 6-fold lower levels in other brain regions investigated). Secretoneurin has been shown to have potent angiogenic activity in vivo in mouse cornea model and in vitro in a 3-dimensional gel. Secretoneurin also stimulates dopamine release from the central striatal neurons and basal ganglia.

== Signaling ==
PI3 kinase, phosphodiesterase and phospholipase D inhibition inhibits its pro-migration effects, but blocking PKC and tyrosine kinases has not been shown to have effect. Downstream to these ERK type MAP kinase and AKT are activated.
