= Tubular carcinoma =

Type of breast cancer

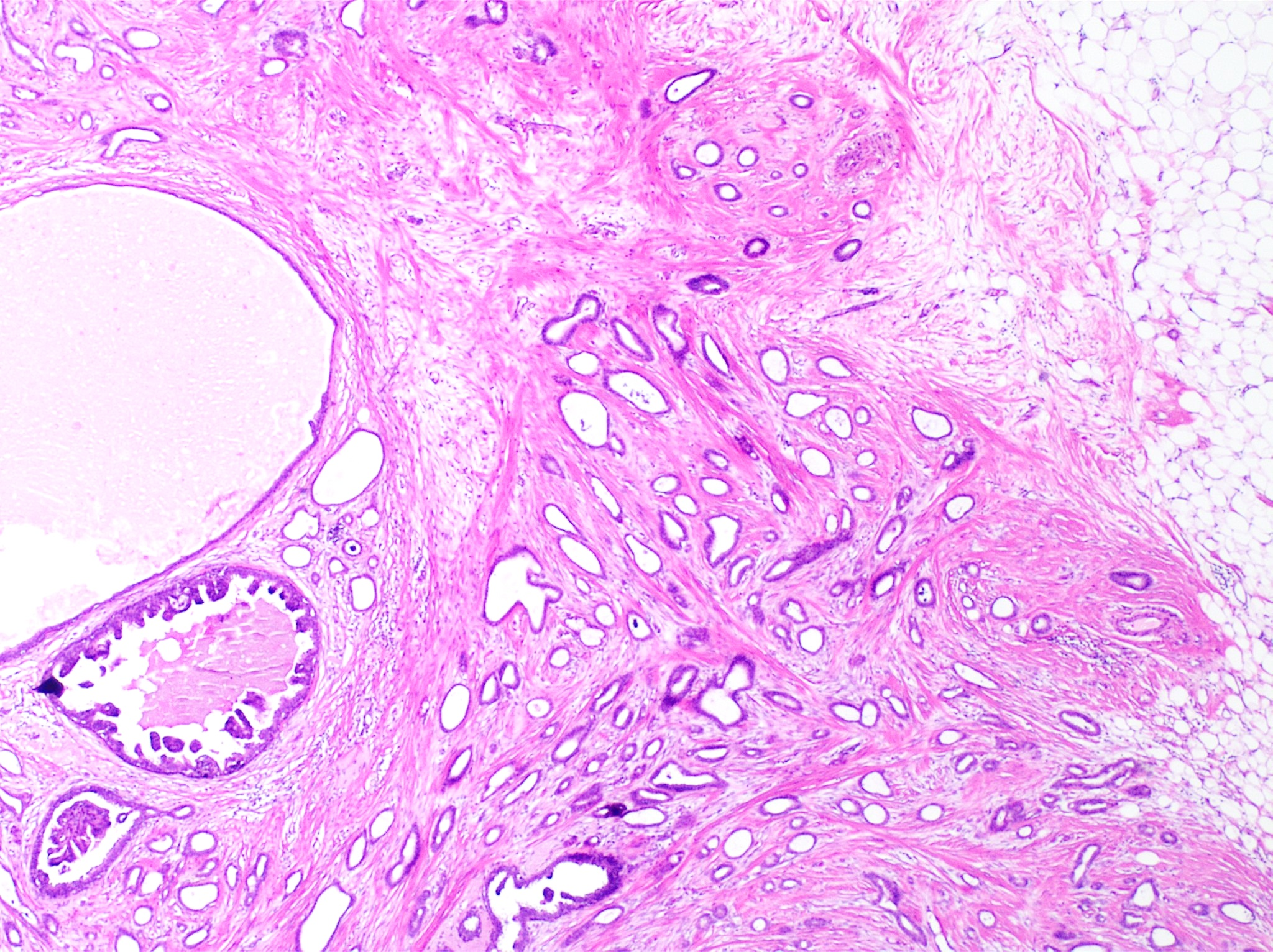
Histopathology of tubular carcinoma, low magnification, H&E stain. It shows the typical features of invasive breast cancer with infiltrative growth pattern, here including invasion into adipose tissue and with an associated fibrous or desmoplastic stromal response. It has the criterion of more than 90% of the tumor composed of small, ovoid or angulated tubules with open lumina. Ductal carcinoma in situ is seen at left as lumina with micropapillary formations (under the larger bland cyst), and was presumably the precursor lesion for the ductal carcinoma.

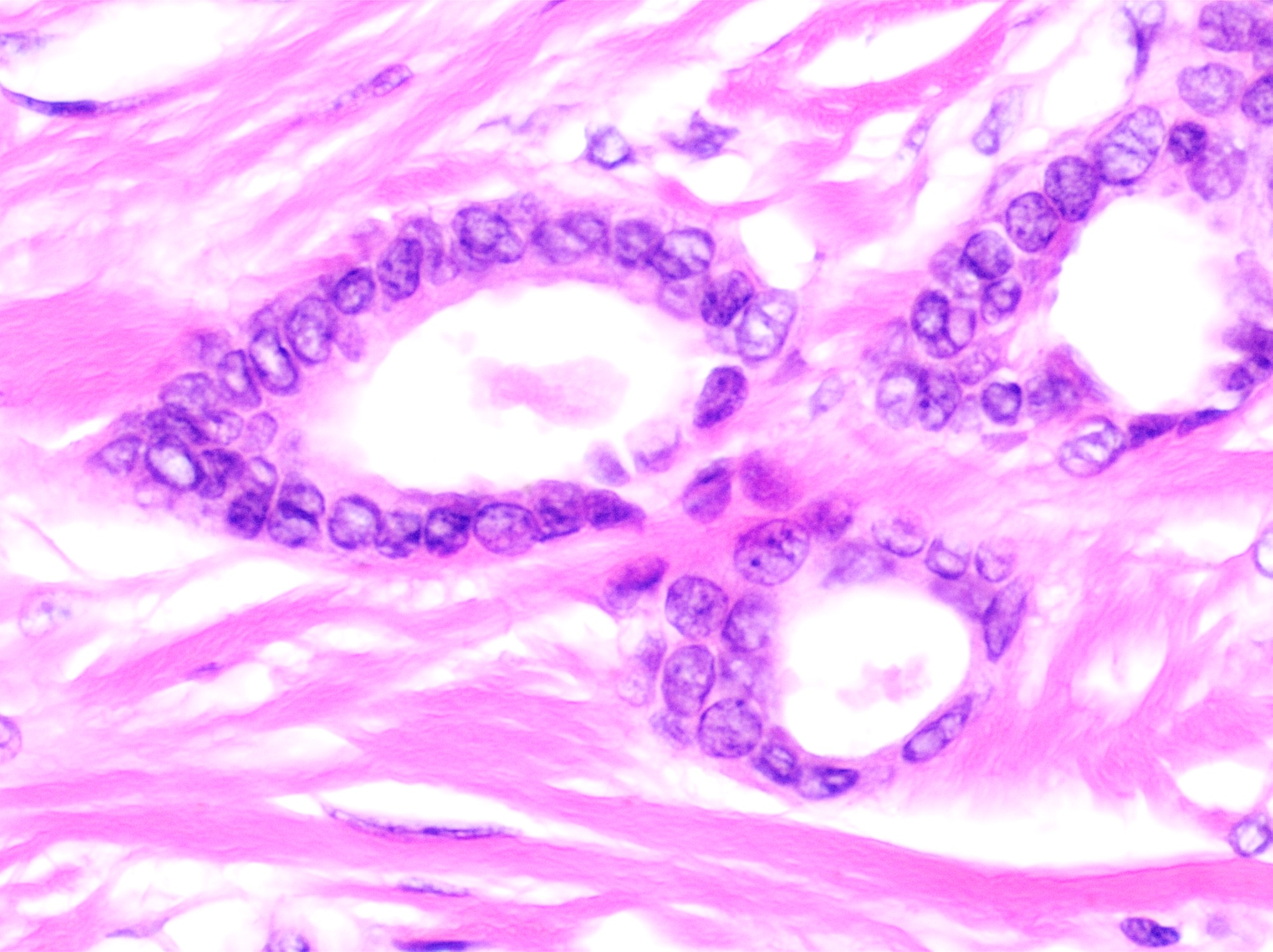
Histopathology of tubular carcinoma, high magnification, H&E stain. It shows the typical features of tubules lined by a single layer of cuboidal to columnar epithelial cells with small to intermediate sized nuclei low grade nuclei and sparse mitoses (grade 1).

Tubular carcinoma is a subtype of invasive ductal carcinoma of the breast. More rarely, tubular carcinomas may arise in the pancreas or kidney. Most tubular carcinomas begin in the milk duct of the breast and spread to healthy tissue around it.

== Pathology ==
Although tubular carcinoma has been considered a special-type tumor, (Note: Special-type tumor: such as mucinous and cribriform carcinomas.) recent trend has been to classify it as a low-grade, invasive NOS carcinoma because there is a continuous spectrum from pure tubular carcinomas to mixed NOS (Note: NOS: of type "Not Otherwise Specified".) carcinomas with tubular features, depending on the percentage of the lesion that displays tubular features.

== Histology ==
Tubular carcinomas are generally around 1 cm. or smaller, and are made up of tubules. They are usually low-grade. Elastosis has been noted as common but is not present in all cases.

== Prevalence ==
Prevalence has previously been controversial, with contradictory reports from studies reporting either very low prevalence, or a high prevalence. With the increasing availability of screening mammography, however, tubular carcinomas are being diagnosed earlier, and more recent studies suggest tubular carcinomas represent between 8% and 27% of all breast cancers.

== Prognosis ==
Tubular carcinoma is one of the histologic types of breast cancer with a more favorable outcome.

== See also ==
- Breast cancer classification
- Ductal carcinoma in situ – a common precancerous or Stage 0 breast cancer
- Invasive cribriform carcinoma of the breast – a rare breast cancer that consists of >50% cribriform histopathology but commonly has small or large areas (<50%) closely resembling tubular carcinoma histopathology.
- Intraductal papillary mucinous neoplasm
- Invasive carcinoma of no special type
- Invasive lobular carcinoma
- Invasion (cancer)

== Notes and references ==
Notes
