= Neuroendocrine differentiation =

Neuroendocrine differentiation is a term primarily used in relation to prostate cancers that display a significant neuroendocrine cell population on histopathological examination. These types of prostate cancer comprise true neuroendocrine cancers, such as small cell carcinoma, carcinoid and carcinoid-like tumors, as well as prostatic adenocarcinoma exhibiting focal neuroendocrine phenotype.

== Normal function ==
Prostatic neuroendocrine cells, also known as endocrine-paracrine cells, are part of a larger regulatory cell population scattered throughout the whole organism, collectively known as diffuse neuroendocrine system or APUD cells. Neuroendocrine cells are present in all regions of the human prostate, most notably around the ducts, but also in the acinar epithelium and prostatic urothelium; there is a significant inter-individual variability. Two morphologic types have been described: the open type, extending slender apical processes to the ductal or acinar lumen, and the closed type cells, which lack lumenal protrusions but display dendrite-like processes that extend between adjacent epithelial cells.

Neuroendocrine cells in the human prostate contain a diverse array of secretory products: serotonin (which is present in virtually all neuroendocrine prostatic cells), chromogranin A (CgA), synaptophysin and neuron-specific enolase (NSE) (three proteins that are used as markers for neuroendocrine cells) calcitonin and other peptides of the calcitonin family (calcitonin gene-related peptide (CGRP) and katacalcin, which colocalize to the calcitonin-containing cells), bombesin/gastrin-releasing peptide (GRP), thyroid stimulating hormone-like peptide, parathyroid hormone-related protein (PTHrP), alpha-human chorionic gonadotropin (hCG), somatostatin, cholecystokinin, vasoactive intestinal peptide (VIP), neuropeptide Y, vascular endothelial growth factor (VEGF), and adrenomedullin. The physiology of their secretion and its regulation is incompletely understood. Regulatory cues might come through endocrine, paracrine (from neighboring neuroendocrine cells), autocrine or neurocrine routes. The open type cells may in addition receive regulatory signals from luminal molecules The developmental origin of these cells is as yet unknown. They are thought to arise from a different precursor than other epithelial prostatic cells, possibly through a neurogenic lineage of their own, which is therefore distinct from the secretory and basal cells that derive from urogenital sinus.

== Role in prostate cancer ==
The most heavily studied aspect of neuroendocrine differentiation in prostate cancer (but not the only one, as mentioned above) is the focal type, which refers to a conventional prostatic adenocarcinoma that exhibits neuroendocrine foci at histopathological examination. Tumor xenografts of mice subjected to castration have been shown to undergo rapid regression with a dramatic drop in androgen receptor expression in tumor cells and a steep increase in the proportion of apoptotic cells Following castration, the proportion, as well as the density of neuroendocrine tumor cells, rises abruptly, eventually leading to the formation of neuroendocrine cell islets that are spread throughout the tumor and account for the majority of its constituent cells.

The immunohistochemical phenotype of focal neuroendocrine differentiation in prostate cancer has been intensively studied. Chromogranin A, which is the most abundant product of prostatic neuroendocrine cells and neuroendocrine tumor cells, is widely recognized as a reliable marker for neuroendocrine differentiation. Synaptophysin and neuron-specific enolase are also reliable markers. The most frequently encountered products in neuroendocrine tumor cells across prostate cancer samples appear to be calcitonin (in more than one third of cases), neurotensin, serotonin, human chorionic gonadotropin, vasoactive intestinal peptide (VIP) and bombesin/gastrin-releasing peptide. Neuroendocrine tumor cells express cytokeratins that are typically expressed by luminal secretory type cells, but lack basal cell markers such as high molecular weight cytokeratin and p63. They are negative for androgen receptor and prostate-specific antigen (PSA) and are positive for prostate acid phosphatase. Neuroendocrine tumor cells are also negative for the proliferation marker Ki-67; however, adjacent non-neuroendocrine tumor cells appear to display an increased expression of Ki-67. As opposed to their normal neuroendocrine counterparts, tumor neuroendocrine cells express the beta-oxidative enzyme alpha-methylacyl-CoA racemase, which is a recently described marker for prostate cancer.

As opposed to the focal type of neuroendocrine differentiation seen in prostatic adenocarcinoma, small cell carcinoma of the prostate, in turn, exhibit a universal type in that virtually all the constituent tumor cells display neuroendocrine features. Immunohistochemically, prostatic small cell carcinoma are positive for thyroid transcription factor 1 (TTF-1), CD56, chromogranin A, synaptophysin, neuron-specific enolase, calcitonin and bombesin/gastrin-releasing peptide, while lacking, or rarely and weakly expressing, androgen receptor and prostate-specific antigen.

It is commonly believed that prostatic adenocarcinoma exhibiting significant neuroendocrine differentiation is less differentiated, more aggressive and hormone therapy-resistant.
