= SCG3 =

Protein-coding gene in the species Homo sapiens

Identifiers
- Aliases: SCG3, SGIII, secretogranin III
- External IDs: OMIM: 611796; MGI: 103032; GeneCards: SCG3

Gene location (Human)
Chr.	Chromosome 15 (human)
Band	15q21.2	Start	51,681,492 bp
Band	15q21.2	End	51,721,026 bp

Gene location (Mouse)
Chr.	Chromosome 9 (mouse)
Band	9 D|9 42.32 cM	Start	75,550,471 bp
Band	9 D|9 42.32 cM	End	75,591,338 bp
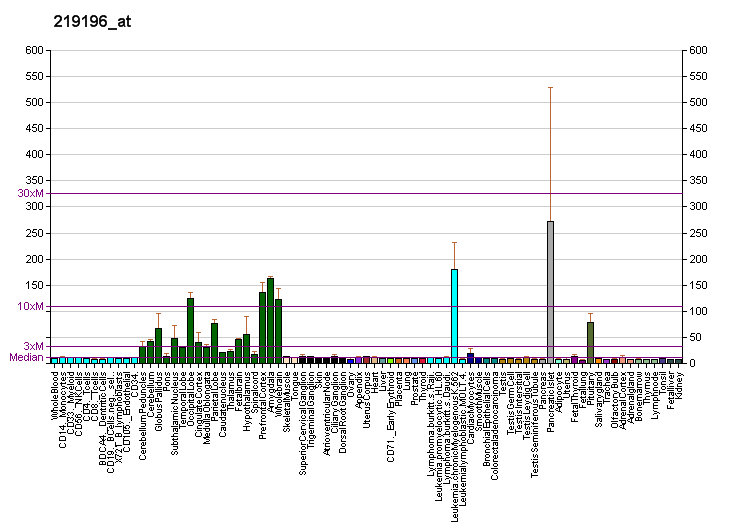
RNA expression pattern
Bgee	Human / Mouse (ortholog); Top expressed in: islet of Langerhans; beta cell; dorsolateral prefrontal cortex; right frontal lobe; Brodmann area 9; anterior cingulate cortex; prefrontal cortex; ganglionic eminence; amygdala; caudate nucleus / Top expressed in: deep cerebellar nuclei; islet of Langerhans; pontine nuclei; medial vestibular nucleus; dorsal tegmental nucleus; cerebellar vermis; arcuate nucleus; paraventricular nucleus of hypothalamus; dorsomedial hypothalamic nucleus; lobe of cerebellum; More reference expression data
BioGPS	More reference expression data
Gene ontology
Molecular function	RNA binding
Cellular component	extracellular region; secretory granule lumen; transport vesicle membrane; membrane; cytoplasmic vesicle; endoplasmic reticulum lumen; secretory granule membrane; transport vesicle
Biological process	platelet degranulation; post-translational protein modification; protein localization to secretory granule
Sources:Amigo / QuickGO
Orthologs
Databases	NCBI: entry; OMA: entry
Species	Human	Mouse
Entrez	29106	20255
Ensembl	ENSG00000104112	ENSMUSG00000032181
UniProt	Q8WXD2	P47867
RefSeq (mRNA)	NM_013243; NM_001165257	NM_001164790; NM_009130
RefSeq (protein)	NP_001158729; NP_037375	NP_001158262; NP_033156
Location (UCSC)	Chr 15: 51.68 – 51.72 Mb	Chr 9: 75.55 – 75.59 Mb
PubMed search
- Wikidata
View/Edit Human	View/Edit Mouse

Secretogranin III, also known as SCG3, is a protein which in humans is encoded by the SCG3 gene.

== Function ==
The protein encoded by this gene is a member of the chromogranin/secretogranin family of neuroendocrine secretory proteins. Granins may serve as precursors for biologically active peptides. Some granins have been shown to function as helper proteins in sorting and proteolytic processing of prohormones; however, the function of this protein is unknown.
