= Chromogranin-A =

Mammalian protein found in humans

CHGA

Identifiers
- Aliases: CHGA, CGA, chromogranin A, Chromogranin A, PHES, PHE5
- External IDs: OMIM: 118910; MGI: 88394; GeneCards: CHGA
Available structures
PDB	Ortholog search: PDBe RCSB
PDB	List of PDB id codes 1LV4

Gene location (Human)
Chr.	Chromosome 14 (human)
Band	14q32.12	Start	92,923,150 bp
Band	14q32.12	End	92,935,285 bp

Gene location (Mouse)
Chr.	Chromosome 12 (mouse)
Band	12 E|12 51.66 cM	Start	102,521,228 bp
Band	12 E|12 51.66 cM	End	102,531,287 bp
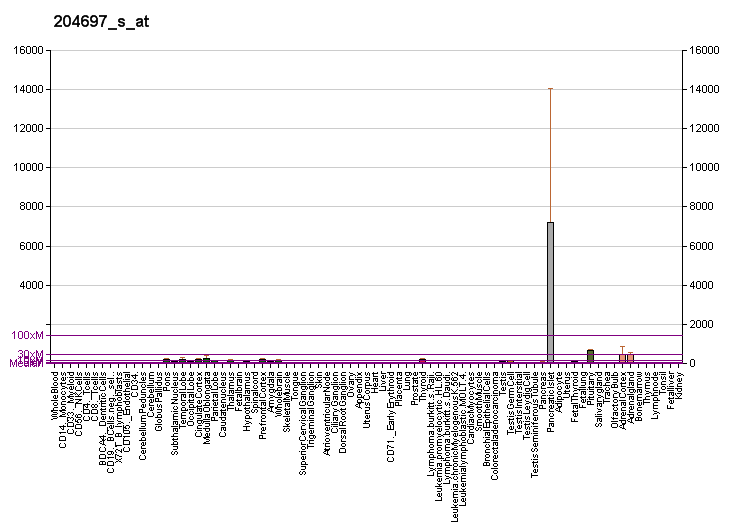
RNA expression pattern
Bgee	Human / Mouse (ortholog); Top expressed in: islet of Langerhans; primary visual cortex; duodenum; superior frontal gyrus; pituitary gland; dorsolateral prefrontal cortex; prefrontal cortex; Brodmann area 9; rectum; anterior pituitary / Top expressed in: islet of Langerhans; adrenal gland; pituitary gland; median eminence; motor neuron; olfactory epithelium; neural layer of retina; superior frontal gyrus; superior cervical ganglion; epithelium of stomach; More reference expression data
BioGPS	More reference expression data
Orthologs
Databases	NCBI: entry; OMA: entry
Species	Human	Mouse
Entrez	1113	12652
Ensembl	ENSG00000276781; ENSG00000100604	ENSMUSG00000021194
UniProt	P10645	P26339
RefSeq (mRNA)	NM_001275; NM_001301690	NM_007693
RefSeq (protein)	NP_001266; NP_001288619; NP_001288619.1	NP_031719
Location (UCSC)	Chr 14: 92.92 – 92.94 Mb	Chr 12: 102.52 – 102.53 Mb
PubMed search
- Wikidata
View/Edit Human	View/Edit Mouse

Chromogranin-A (CgA) or parathyroid secretory protein 1 is encoded in the human by the gene CHGA. Cga is a member of the granin family of neuroendocrine secretory proteins. As such, it is located in secretory vesicles of neurons and endocrine cells such as islet beta cell secretory granules in the pancreas.

== Tissue distribution ==
Examples of cells producing chromogranin-A (CgA) are chromaffin cells of the adrenal medulla, paraganglia, enterochromaffin-like cells and beta cells of the pancreas. It is present in islet beta cell secretory granules. chromogranin-A (CgA)+ Pulmonary neuroendocrine cells account for 0.41% of all epithelial cells in the conducting airway, but are absent from the alveoli.

== Function ==
Chromogranin-A is the precursor to several functional peptides including vasostatin-1, vasostatin-2, pancreastatin, catestatin and parastatin. These peptides negatively modulate the neuroendocrine function of the releasing cell (autocrine) or nearby cells (paracrine).

Chromogranin-A induces and promotes the generation of secretory granules such as those containing insulin in pancreatic islet beta cells. Chromogranin-A is also present in the secretory granules of chromaffin cells and is co-released with catecholamines, playing a role in regulating their release.

== Clinical significance ==
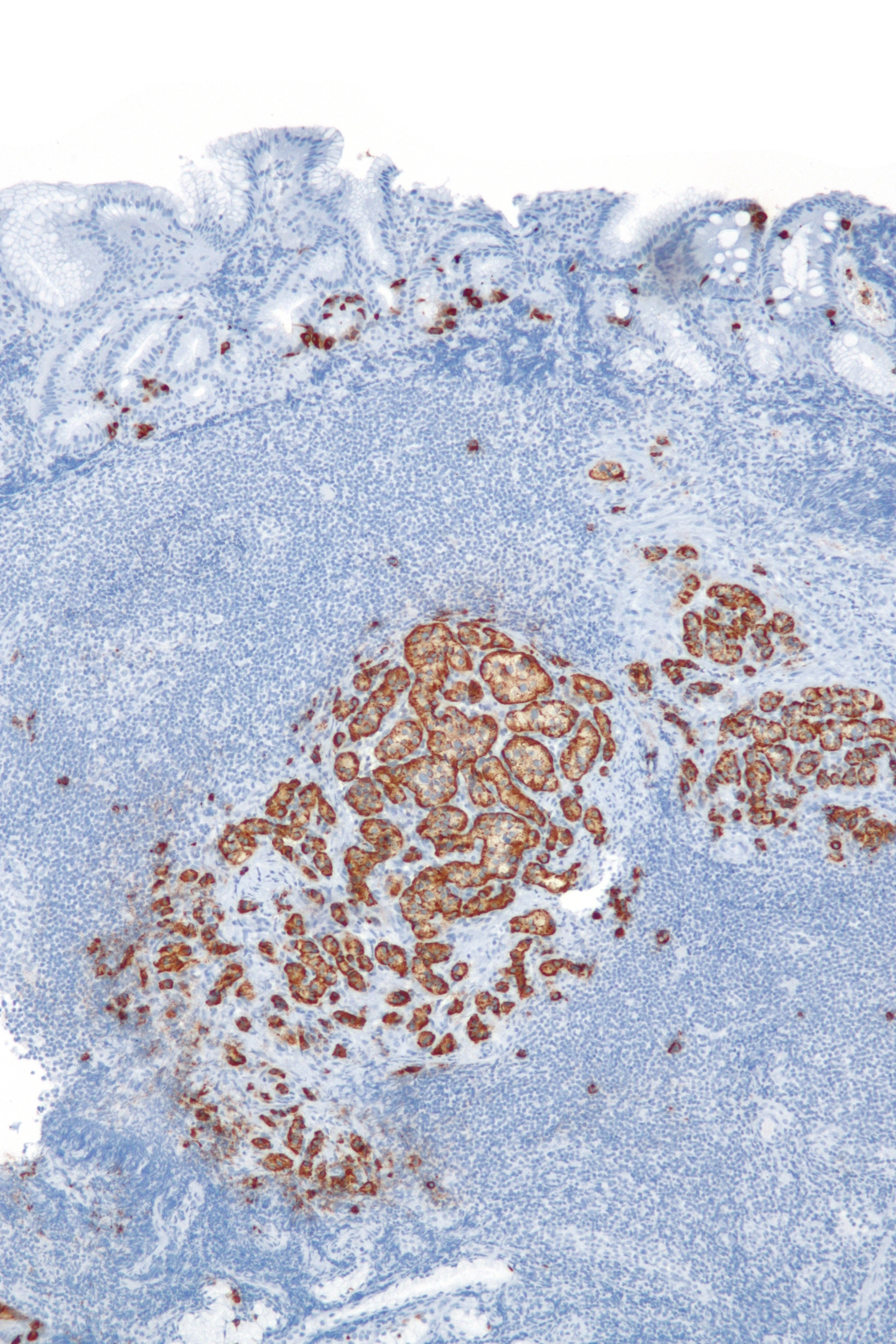
Micrograph of a paraganglioma stained with chromogranin-A immunostain.

Chromogranin-A is elevated in pheochromocytomas. It has been identified as autoantigen in type 1 diabetes. A peptide fragment of CgA located in the Vasostatin-1, namely ChgA29-42 has been identified as the antigenic epitope recognized by diabetogenic BDC2.5 T cells from type 1 diabetes prone NOD mice.

It is used as an indicator for pancreas and prostate cancer and in carcinoid syndrome. It might play a role in early neoplastic progression. Chromogranin-A is cleaved by an endogenous prohormone convertase to produce several peptide fragments. See chromogranin A GeneRIFs for references. In immunohistochemistry it can be used to identify a range of neuroendocrine tumours and is highly specific for both benign and malignant cells of this type.

Mass spectrometry data shows that several peptides originating from CHGA (163-194; 194–214; 272–295;) are significantly lower in samples from ulcerative colitis patients compared to control biopsies.

There are considerable differences in the amino acid composition between different species' chromogranin-A . Commercial assays for measuring human CgA can usually not be used for measuring CgA in samples from other animals. Some specific parts of the molecule have a higher degree of amino acid homology and methods where the antibodies are directed against specific epitopes can be used to measure samples from different animals. Region-specific assays measuring defined parts of CgA, CGB and SG2 can be used for measurements in samples from cats and dogs. In dogs, the catestatin concentration showed weak negative associations with left atrial and ventricular sizes and the catestatin concentration showed weak positive associations with blood pressure.

== Variants ==
Variants exist for pancreastatin in various populations of the world. The variant Glycine297Serine has been shown to be more potent in inhibiting insulin-induced glucose uptake, resulting in higher risk of insulin resistance and diabetes among carriers of this variant. A team of researchers led by the Indian Institute of Technology Madras has found that the Glycine297Serine variation was present in approximately 15 percent of Indian and other South Asian populations.
