= MS15203 =

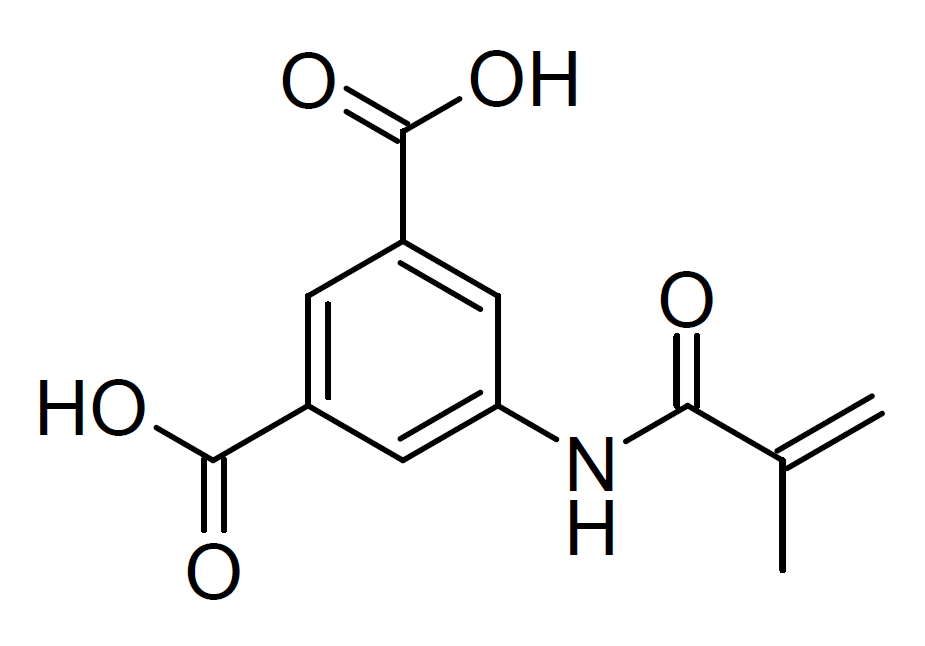

Identifiers
- IUPAC name: 5-(2-methylprop-2-enoylamino)benzene-1,3-dicarboxylic acid
- CAS Number: 73912-52-4
- PubChem CID: 773544
- ChemSpider: 676193
- CompTox Dashboard (EPA): DTXSID50995912

Chemical and physical data
- Formula: C_{12}H_{11}NO_{5}
- Molar mass: 249.222 g·mol^{−1}
- 3D model (JSmol): Interactive image
- SMILES: CC(=C)C(=O)NC1=CC(=CC(=C1)C(=O)O)C(=O)O
- InChI: InChI=1S/C12H11NO5/c1-6(2)10(14)13-9-4-7(11(15)16)3-8(5-9)12(17)18/h3-5H,1H2,2H3,(H,13,14)(H,15,16)(H,17,18); Key:NVOBVSWSDYFEMR-UHFFFAOYSA-N

MS15203 (5-Methacrylamidoisophthalic acid) is an experimental drug which acts as a selective agonist for the neuropeptide receptor GPR171. In studies on mice it increases food intake and has analgesic effects, but shows sex-selective activity with greater effects in male mice than in female mice.
