= SCG5 =

Protein-coding gene in humans

Identifiers
- Aliases: SCG5, 7B2, P7B2, SGNE1, SgV, secretogranin V
- External IDs: OMIM: 173120; MGI: 98289; GeneCards: SCG5

Gene location (Human)
Chr.	Chromosome 15 (human)
Band	15q13.3	Start	32,641,676 bp
Band	15q13.3	End	32,697,098 bp

Gene location (Mouse)
Chr.	Chromosome 2 (mouse)
Band	2 E4|2 57.45 cM	Start	113,776,362 bp
Band	2 E4|2 57.45 cM	End	113,829,121 bp
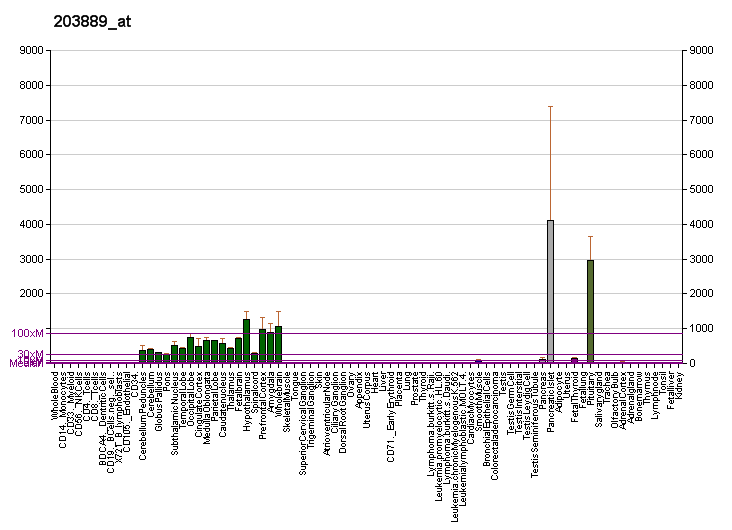
RNA expression pattern
Bgee	Human / Mouse (ortholog); Top expressed in: islet of Langerhans; superior frontal gyrus; primary visual cortex; prefrontal cortex; Brodmann area 9; anterior pituitary; cerebellar cortex; hypothalamus; cerebellar hemisphere; nucleus accumbens / Top expressed in: paraventricular nucleus of hypothalamus; medial vestibular nucleus; lateral geniculate nucleus; medial dorsal nucleus; medial geniculate nucleus; dorsal tegmental nucleus; pontine nuclei; dorsomedial hypothalamic nucleus; ventral tegmental area; lateral hypothalamus; More reference expression data
BioGPS	More reference expression data
Gene ontology
Molecular function	unfolded protein binding; enzyme inhibitor activity; GTP binding; protein binding
Cellular component	extracellular region; secretory granule
Biological process	regulation of hormone secretion; intracellular protein transport; neuropeptide signaling pathway; peptide hormone processing; negative regulation of catalytic activity
Sources:Amigo / QuickGO
Orthologs
Databases	NCBI: entry; OMA: entry
Species	Human	Mouse
Entrez	6447	20394
Ensembl	ENSG00000277614; ENSG00000166922; ENSG00000281931	ENSMUSG00000023236
UniProt	P05408	P12961
RefSeq (mRNA)	NM_001144757; NM_003020; NM_001394278; NM_001394279	NM_009162
RefSeq (protein)	NP_001138229; NP_003011	NP_033188
Location (UCSC)	Chr 15: 32.64 – 32.7 Mb	Chr 2: 113.78 – 113.83 Mb
PubMed search
- Wikidata
View/Edit Human	View/Edit Mouse

Neuroendocrine protein 7B2 is a protein that in humans is encoded by the SCG5 gene. The protein expressed by this gene is widely distributed in neuroendocrine tissues. It functions as a chaperone protein for the proprotein convertase PC2 by blocking the aggregation of this protein, and is required for the production of an active PC2 enzyme. It is an intrinsically disordered protein that may also function as a chaperone for other aggregating secretory proteins in addition to proPC2 (Helwig et al. 2013). 7B2 has been identified in vertebrates and in invertebrates as low as flatworms (Protein ID: AIZ72728.1) and insects. It is also called Sgne1 and Secretogranin V. In C. elegans, it was originally called e7B2 and then renamed Seven B Two (gene name sbt-1). There is a Pfam entry for this protein: Secretogranin_V (PF05281).
