= Invasive cribriform carcinoma of the breast =

Cribriform carcinoma of the breast
- Other names: Invasive cribriform carcinoma
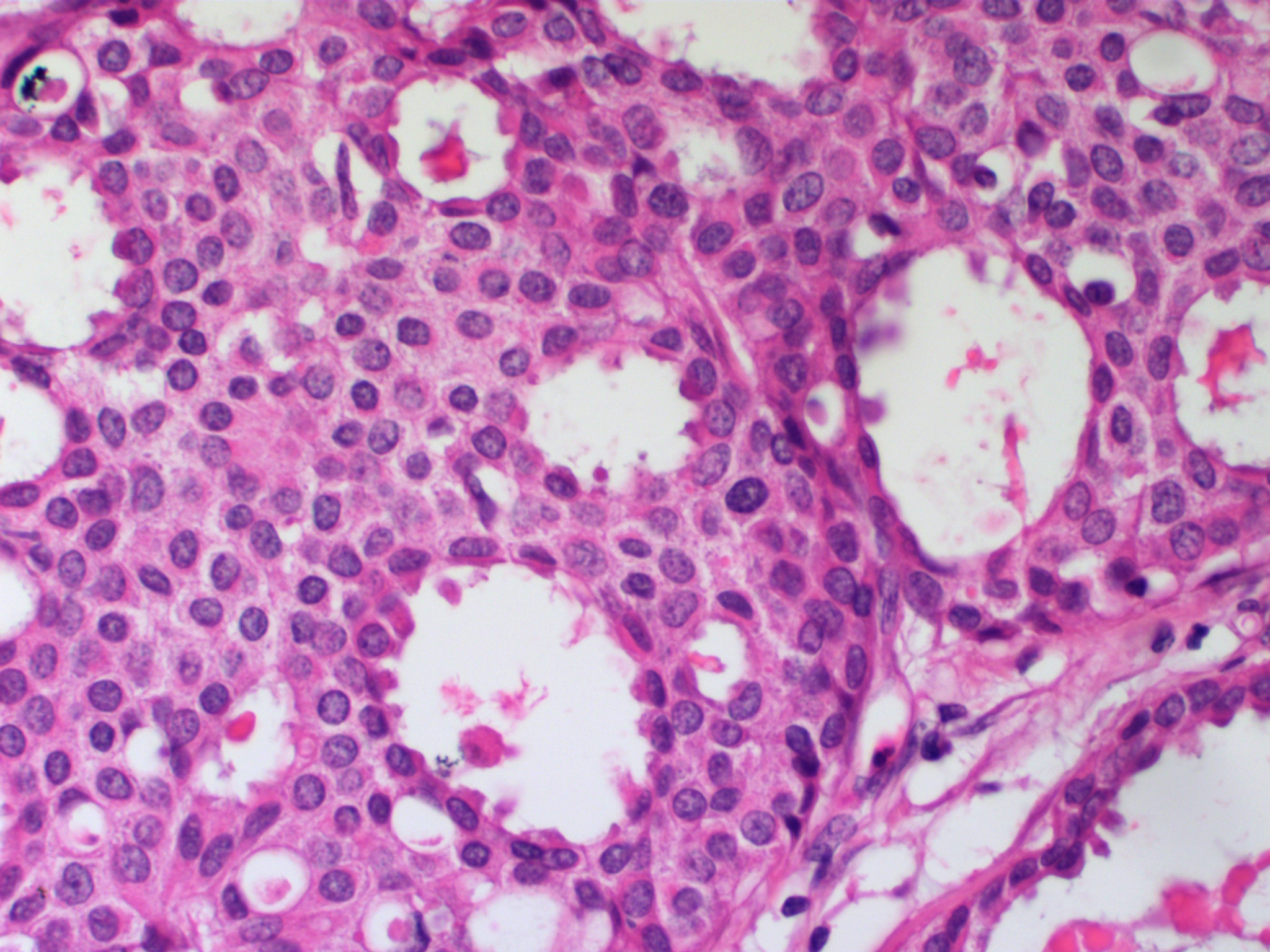
- Cribriform carcinoma of the breast showing a cribriform area
- Specialty: Oncology, Surgical oncology
- Prognosis: excellent

Invasive cribriform carcinoma of the breast (ICCB), also termed invasive cribriform carcinoma, is a rare type of breast cancer that accounts for 0.3% to 0.6% of all carcinomas (i.e. cancers that develop from epithelial cells) in the breast. It originates in a lactiferous duct as opposed to the lobules that form the alveoli in the breasts' mammary glands (lobules make the milk which the ducts channel to the breast's nipple). ICCB was first described by Dixon and colleagues in 1983 as a tumor that on microscopic histopathological inspection had a cribriform pattern, i.e. a tissue pattern consisting of numerous "Swiss cheese"-like open spaces and/or sieve-like small holes (see adjacent Figure). The latest edition (2019) of the World Health Organization (2019) termed these lesions invasive cribriform carcinomas indicating that by definition they must have a component that invades out of their ducts of origin into adjacent tissues. In situ ductal cancers (i.e. cancers localized entirely within their tissues of origin) that have a cribriform histopathology are regarded as belonging to the group of ductal carcinoma in situ tumors.

Rarely, cancers with the histopathological cribriform pattern develop in other organs such as the prostate gland (termed invasive cribriform prostate cancer or cribriform prostate cancer), salivary gland (termed cribriform adenocarcinoma of salivary glands), sweat glands (termed primary cutaneous cribriform apocrine carcinoma), thyroid gland (termed cribriform-morular thyroid carcinoma), colon (termed cribriform colon cancer), and lung (termed cribriform pattern in lung adenocarcinoma and considered to be a rare variant of acinar adenocrcinoma of the lung). Here, the term invasive cribriform carcinoma of the breast rather than invasive cribriform carcinoma is used in order to clearly distinguish it from these other cribriform carcinomas.

ICCB, while clearly a cancerous tumor that occurs predominantly in older females and in rare cases males, has many favorable clinical and pathological features including a low rate of metastasizing to distant tissues and an excellent prognosis. Earlier editions of the World Health Organization divided ICCB into two forms, the "pure" form (sometimes termed "classical"), i.e. ICCB tumors that had >90% cribriform areas, and the "mixed" form, i.e. ICCB tumors that had >50% cribriform areas with the remaining areas having a tubular histological pattern. However, many earlier and more recent studies have regarded mixed ICCB as consisting of >50% cribriform areas with the remaining areas containing tubular or certain other histopathological patterns. The latter definition of mixed ICCB is used here.

== Presentation ==
Individuals presenting with ICCB in one large study were on average 61 years/old post-menopausal females and similarly aged males (average age 65.4) with the males representing 1.7% of all cases. However, individuals as young as 14 and 18 years have been diagnosed with the disease. ICCB tumors are small (i.e. 58%-75.4% less than 2-5 centimeters and 22%-38% more than 2-5 centimeters in largest diameters), asymptomatic masses first detected by palpation or screening methods such as mammography or medical ultrasound. Screening methods often (i.e. 32% of cases) detect areas of microcalcification (i.e. tiny deposits of calcium) in the masses. In a relatively small percentage of cases (e.g. 15.9 to 25.5% in most studies), the workup of these individuals finds that their tumor has metastasized (i.e. spread) to the lymph nodes in the nearby axilla (i.e. armpit). Very rarely, individuals have presented with: an ulcerated skin lesions or inverted nipple, with recurrences at or near to the site were a ICCB tumor had been surgically removed, or with metastases to distant tissues such as the vertebral bones.

== Pathology ==
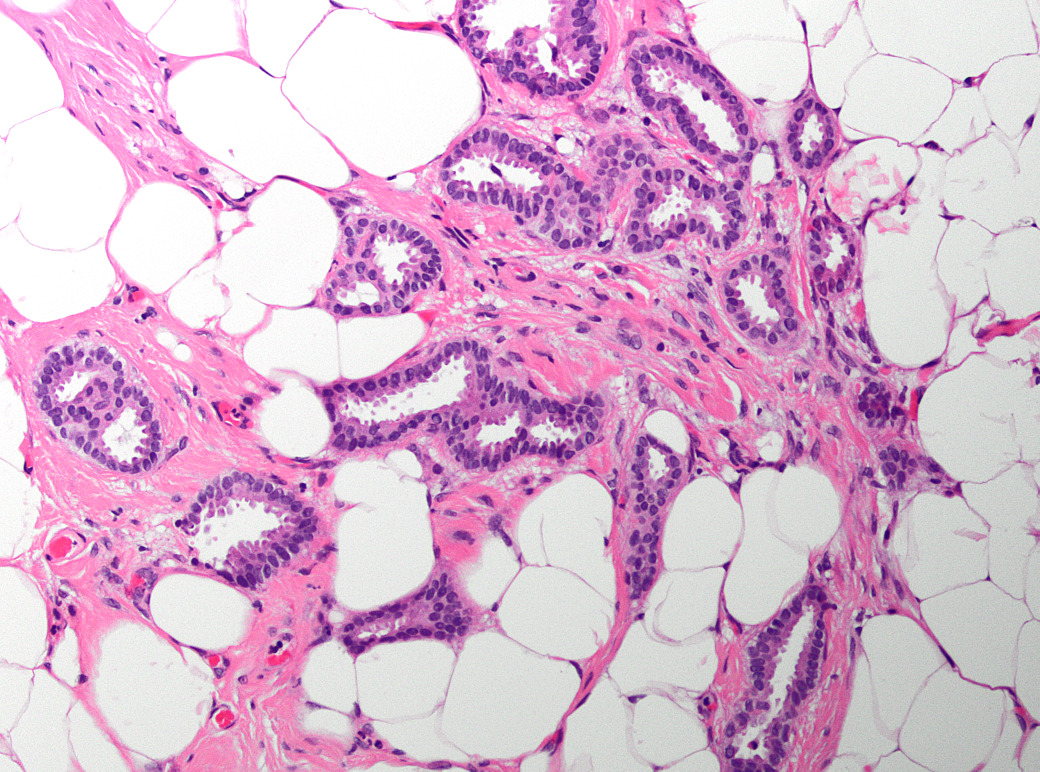
18S08891 tubular carcinoma x20a

The microscopic histopathology of ICCB tumors stained with hematoxylin and eosin shows cribriform areas covering more than 50% of the tumor with the remaining tumor areas showing tubular and/or other histopathological patterns. The cribriform areas consist of small-sized cells with amphophilic (i.e. taking up both the hematoxylin and eosin stains) cytoplasm, indistinct cell boundaries, and small-to-medium sized nuclei that are surrounded by a sharp nuclear membrane and contain finely stippled chromatin (i.e. DNA coated with protein). Numerous open spaces and/or sieve-like small holes lie between these cells (see above photomicrograph) to give the lesions a Swiss cheese-like appearance. The spaces and holes may contain microcalcifications and/or mucins (i.e. high molecular weight, sugar-linked proteins normally produced and secreted by the mammary gland and found in milk). The cells around these spaces and holes sometimes have "apical snouts", i.e. small protrusions on the side of the cells that faces the spaces and holes. Tubular areas (see adjacent photomicrograph of a tubular carcinoma) consist of well-formed tubules lined with mostly normal appearing tubular cells. The other histopathological patterns that may occur in these tumor types include the pattern associated with invasive carcinoma of no special type or in uncommon cases the pattern associated with mucinous carcinoma of the breast. The invasive component of these tumors almost always has the cribriform histopathology pattern. All of the tumor cells in ICCB are typically slow-growing as evidenced by their low mitotic index (i.e. the ratio of the number of dividing cells to the total number of tumor cells) or low levels of cellular Ki-67 protein (an index of cell proliferation).

A Seer study of 750 individuals with pure or mixed ICCB reported that: a) 92.8% consisted of tumor cells that were scored well-differentiated (i.e. grade 1) or moderately well-differentiated (grade 2) (differentiation is the degree to which tumor cells resemble the non-cancerous cells in the tissue from which they derived) while 7.2% were scored poorly-differentiated (grade 3) or undifferentiated (grade 4) tumor cells; b) 76.1, 20.0, 2.6, and 1.3% of the cases had T1, T2, T3, and T4 tumors, respectively (increasing T numbers indicate increasing tumor size and/or invasion into adjacent tissues); c) 83.2, 13,6, 2.4. and 0.8% of all cases had tumors which metastasized respectively to 0 (i.e. no metastasis), 1, 2, or 3 nearby armpit lymph nodes; and d) 1.3% of all cases had metastasizes in distant tissues (the tissue sites were not identified). In a study of 42 individuals, 16 (38.1%) had pure and 26 (61.9%) had mixed ICCB; there were no significant differences in age of presentation, tumor size, or tumor grade between pure and mixed ICCB; pure ICCB had 5 (31.5%) and mixed ICCB had 16 (61.5%) cases that were associated with lymph node metastases; and there were no cases that had distant tissue metastases.

=== Immunohistochemistry ===
Microscopic inspection of immunostained (i.e. a method that uses specially prepared antibodies which attach to specific proteins so that they can be detected and quantified) ICCB tumor cells has shown that they express estrogen receptors in about 95.4% of cases, progesterone receptors in about 89.5% of cases, and the HER2/neu protein in about 3% of cases. The estrogen and progesterone receptors and HER2/neu protein, when expressed by breast cancer tumor cells, are therapeutic targets for treating various forms of breast cancer including ICCB. ICCB tumors also typically have cells that express cytokeratin proteins but not myoepithelial marker proteins such as tumor protein 63, smooth muscle actin, calponin, or CD10.

== Diagnosis ==
The diagnosis of ICCB tumors is based on the histopathology and immunohistochemistry of their hematoxylin and eosin-stained tissues, particularly on identifying their predominantly cribriform structure and invasion into adjacent tissues. Immunostaining to define the expression pattern of the elements outlined in the above Immunohistochemistry section have also been used to support the diagnoses in less clear cases. Adenoid cystic carcinoma and certain neuroendocrine tumors have been mistaken for ICCB tumors. Adenoid cystic carcinomas are distinguished form ICCB by having open spaces that are PAS diastase stain-positive and by the presence of tumor cells which express cKit but not estrogen and progesterone receptors; ICCB tumor open spaces are PAS diastase stain-negative and their tumor cells do not express cKit but do express estrogen and progesterone receptors. Neuroendocrine tumors with an invasive component (many of these tumors are non-invasive) are differentiated from ICCB tumors by their content of spindle-shaped cells, cells that resemble plasma cells, and large clear cells; these types of cells are typically not found in ICCB tumors.

== Treatment ==
Due to their relative rarity, standard treatment guidelines have not been formally identified or defined for ICCB tumors. Consequently, current treatments for these tumors are based on protocols used to treat invasive carcinoma of no special type. (These treatments have not been strictly examined individually or compared between each other for their effectiveness in treating ICCB. IBBC tumors do have the potential to metastasize to distant tissues if left untreated for a very long time period.) Virtually all patients (97.2% of the 760 cases) in the SEER review study were treated by surgical removal of their tumors. This surgery has typically been either breast-conserving surgery or modified radical mastectomies. Patients with ICCB may also receive adjuvant radiotherapy and/or chemotherapy. In the Seer study, 52.2% were treated with radiotherapy and 22.1% with chemotherapy. The chemotherapy regimens used to treat ICCB have included triple therapy with cyclophosphamide, epirubicin and fluorouracil, double therapy with docetaxel and epirubicin, and triple therapy with cyclophosphamide, doxorubicin and fluorouracil. In more recent studies, virtually all individuals have been treated with adjuvant hormonal therapy drugs, such as letrozole or anastrozole (which block the metabolism of androgen to estrogens by the aromatase enzyme in non-gonad tissues and thereby reduce estrogen levels) or with tamoxifen (which acts indirectly to inhibit the estrogen receptor). Individuals with mixed ICCB have been treated with the more aggressive of these protocols than individuals with pure ICCB in some but not all studies. It has been suggested that pure ICCB tumors might be better treated with the more conservative strategies listed here.

== Prognosis ==
In the Seer study of 750 individuals with ICCB (pure and mixed types not distinguished), the overall survival rates (i.e. includes deaths due to ICCB and any other cause) at 3 and 5 years after initial treatment were 94.4% and 90.3%, respectively. Larger tumor size, presence of distant tissue metastases, higher tumor stages, older age (>67 years old), single or divorced marital status, and lack of progesterone receptors in tumor cells were associated with poorer prognoses while the presence of lymph node metastases did not significantly alter prognosis. A more recent study of 42 patients with ICCB followed for an average of 88 months (range 15–106 months) reported that the median overall survival 5 years after treatment was 100% for both pure and mixed ICCB and the projected 10 year overall survival rate was 100% for pure and 90% for mixed ICCB. Several other studies on small numbers of patients reported that pure and mixed ICCB individuals have 10 year overall survival rates of over 90%. Recurrent ICCB has been successfully treated with surgical removal of the tumor plus chemotherapy and ICCB with metastases to distant tissues has been successfully treated with surgical removal of the breast tumor, chemotherapy, radiotherapy, and long-term treatment with tamoxifen followed by letrozole.
