= Acinar adenocarcinoma =

Gland-forming cancer

Acinar adenocarcinoma is a histological subtype of gland-forming cancer that is diagnosed when cuboidal and/or columnar shaped malignant cells in the neoplastic tissue form acini and tubules. It is a common form of cancer occurring in the lung and prostate gland.

== Acinar adenocarcinoma of the lung ==
Adenocarcinoma ("adeno" = "gland", "carcinoma" = cancer of epithelium) is the most common type of lung cancer in the U.S., Japan, and most of Western Europe, although it is the second most common form in Eastern parts of Europe (after squamous cell carcinoma). Adenocarcinomas are exceptionally heterogeneous neoplasms, occurring in four major tissue architectures (acinar, papillary, bronchioloalveolar, and solid), and several rarer variants. Most commonly, however, these lesions show a mixture of two or more subtypes or variants, and are subclassified as "adenocarcinoma with mixed subtypes".

In China, which has the largest number of smokers and lung cancer cases in the world, the acinar tissue architectural pattern is by far the most common histological subtype of adenocarcinoma, comprising about 40% of all adenocarcinomas, and its incidence has increased significantly in recent decades. In Europe, acinar adenocarcinoma may comprise the dominant architectural pattern in as many as 50–60% of all adenocarcinomas.

Acinar adenocarcinoma of the lung is a highly lethal disease. Overall, the five-year survival rates approximate 16% to 22%. Generally, survival is better in all stages for patients with the acinar (or papillary) pattern than it is in patients with the solid pattern, but considerably worse than those with the bronchioloalveolar pattern. Survival is significantly better in patients whose tumors are well differentiated (i.e. the glands and/or tubules are more completely developed) than when poorly differentiated (i.e. with rudimentary glands).

Some studies suggest that the oncogenes H-ras and fes are important drivers of oncogenesis in many acinar-type lung cancers.

== Acinar adenocarcinoma of the prostate ==
Acinar adenocarcinomas are the most common form of prostate gland malignancy.
