= SCG2 =

Identifiers
- Aliases: SCG2, CHGC, SN, SgII, secretogranin II
- External IDs: OMIM: 118930; MGI: 103033; GeneCards: SCG2

Gene location (Human)
Chr.	Chromosome 2 (human)
Band	2q36.1	Start	223,596,940 bp
Band	2q36.1	End	223,602,361 bp

Gene location (Mouse)
Chr.	Chromosome 1 (mouse)
Band	1 C4|1 40.89 cM	Start	79,412,386 bp
Band	1 C4|1 40.89 cM	End	79,417,837 bp
RNA expression pattern
Bgee	Human / Mouse (ortholog); Top expressed in: beta cell; lateral nuclear group of thalamus; superior vestibular nucleus; pituitary gland; hypothalamus; nucleus accumbens; pars compacta; middle temporal gyrus; anterior pituitary; pars reticulata / Top expressed in: islet of Langerhans; dorsomedial hypothalamic nucleus; ventral tegmental area; arcuate nucleus; ventromedial nucleus; mammillary body; paraventricular nucleus of hypothalamus; dorsal tegmental nucleus; median eminence; adrenal gland; More reference expression data
BioGPS	n/a
Gene ontology
Molecular function	protein binding; chemoattractant activity; cytokine activity
Cellular component	extracellular region; dense core granule; secretory granule; extracellular space; neuronal dense core vesicle; endoplasmic reticulum lumen
Biological process	protein secretion; induction of positive chemotaxis; negative regulation of endothelial cell apoptotic process; eosinophil chemotaxis; positive chemotaxis; negative regulation of extrinsic apoptotic signaling pathway; intracellular signal transduction; inflammatory response; positive regulation of endothelial cell proliferation; endothelial cell migration; angiogenesis; MAPK cascade; negative regulation of endothelial cell proliferation; post-translational protein modification; regulation of signaling receptor activity
Sources:Amigo / QuickGO
Orthologs
Databases	NCBI: entry; OMA: entry
Species	Human	Mouse
Entrez	7857	20254
Ensembl	ENSG00000171951	ENSMUSG00000050711
UniProt	P13521; P15321	Q03517
RefSeq (mRNA)	NM_003469	NM_009129; NM_001310680
RefSeq (protein)	NP_003460	NP_001297609; NP_033155
Location (UCSC)	Chr 2: 223.6 – 223.6 Mb	Chr 1: 79.41 – 79.42 Mb
PubMed search
- Wikidata
View/Edit Human	View/Edit Mouse

SCG2, also called secretogranin II (chromogranin C), is a protein which in humans is encoded by the SCG2 gene.

== Function ==
The protein encoded by this gene is a member of the chromogranin/secretogranin family of neuroendocrine secretory proteins. Studies in rodents suggest that the full-length protein, secretogranin II, is involved in the packaging or sorting of peptide hormones and neuropeptides into secretory vesicles. The full-length protein is cleaved to produce the active peptide secretoneurin, which exerts chemotactic effects on specific cell types, and EM66, whose function is unknown.

== See also ==
- Chromogranin
