= Macromomycin B =

Names
- Preferred IUPAC name Methyl 7-methoxy-2-methylidene-3-oxo-3,4-dihydro-2H-1,4-benzoxazine-5-carboxylate
- Other names Auromomycin

Identifiers
CAS Number	70213-45-5
3D model (JSmol)	Interactive image
ChemSpider	4678085
PubChem CID	5748693
UNII	H4AJ86QK46
CompTox Dashboard (EPA)	DTXSID90220477
- InChI: InChI=1S/C12H11NO5/c1-6-11(14)13-10-8(12(15)17-3)4-7(16-2)5-9(10)18-6/h4-5H,1H2,2-3H3,(H,13,14) Key: HXKWEZFTHHFQMB-UHFFFAOYSA-N; InChI=1/C12H11NO5/c1-6-11(14)13-10-8(12(15)17-3)4-7(16-2)5-9(10)18-6/h4-5H,1H2,2-3H3,(H,13,14) Key: HXKWEZFTHHFQMB-UHFFFAOYAU
- SMILES: O=C(OC)c2cc(OC)cc1O/C(C(=O)Nc12)=C

Properties
Chemical formula	C_{12}H_{11}NO_{5}
Molar mass	249.219
- Except where otherwise noted, data are given for materials in their standard state (at 25 °C [77 °F], 100 kPa). Infobox references

Macromomycin B is an antibiotic with anticancer activity.
