= Secretogranin-1 =

Protein found in humans

CHGB

Identifiers
- Aliases: CHGB, SCG1, chromogranin B
- External IDs: OMIM: 118920; MGI: 88395; GeneCards: CHGB

Gene location (Human)
Chr.	Chromosome 20 (human)
Band	20p12.3	Start	5,911,510 bp
Band	20p12.3	End	5,925,353 bp
RNA expression pattern
Bgee	Human / Mouse (ortholog); Top expressed in: paraflocculus of cerebellum; cerebellar vermis; beta cell; anterior pituitary; pons; right hemisphere of cerebellum; superior vestibular nucleus; endothelial cell; middle temporal gyrus; prefrontal cortex / n/a; More reference expression data
BioGPS	n/a
Gene ontology
Molecular function	protein binding; hormone activity
Cellular component	secretory granule; extracellular region; endoplasmic reticulum lumen; extracellular space
Biological process	post-translational protein modification; regulation of signaling receptor activity; signal transduction
Sources:Amigo / QuickGO
Orthologs
Databases	NCBI: entry; OMA: entry
Species	Human	Mouse
Entrez	1114	12653
Ensembl	ENSG00000089199	ENSMUSG00000027350
UniProt	P05060	P16014
RefSeq (mRNA)	NM_001819	NM_007694
RefSeq (protein)	NP_001810	NP_031720
Location (UCSC)	Chr 20: 5.91 – 5.93 Mb	n/a
PubMed search
- Wikidata
View/Edit Human	View/Edit Mouse

Secretogranin-1, also known as Chromogranin B, is a protein that in humans is encoded by the CHGB gene. It is a member of the granin protein family.
