= Proprotein convertase subtilisin/kexin type 1 inhibitor =

Mammalian protein found in Homo sapiens

PCSK1N

Identifiers
- Aliases: PCSK1N, PROSAAS, SAAS, SCG8, SgVIII, BigLEN, PEN, proprotein convertase subtilisin/kexin type 1 inhibitor
- External IDs: OMIM: 300399; MGI: 1353431; GeneCards: PCSK1N

Gene location (Human)
Chr.	X chromosome (human)
Band	Xp11.23	Start	48,831,096 bp
Band	Xp11.23	End	48,835,610 bp

Gene location (Mouse)
Chr.	X chromosome (mouse)
Band	X|X A1.1	Start	7,786,061 bp
Band	X|X A1.1	End	7,790,649 bp
RNA expression pattern
Bgee	Human / Mouse (ortholog); Top expressed in: anterior pituitary; beta cell; nucleus accumbens; anterior cingulate cortex; amygdala; right frontal lobe; caudate nucleus; hypothalamus; putamen; dorsolateral prefrontal cortex / Top expressed in: entorhinal cortex; perirhinal cortex; median eminence; central gray substance of midbrain; arcuate nucleus; ventromedial nucleus; dorsomedial hypothalamic nucleus; superior colliculus; dorsal tegmental nucleus; mammillary body; More reference expression data
BioGPS	n/a
Gene ontology
Molecular function	endopeptidase inhibitor activity; signaling receptor binding; serine-type endopeptidase inhibitor activity
Cellular component	extracellular region; trans-Golgi network; Golgi apparatus; secretory granule; extracellular space
Biological process	response to dietary excess; response to cold; neuropeptide signaling pathway; peptide hormone processing; negative regulation of endopeptidase activity
Sources:Amigo / QuickGO
Orthologs
Databases	NCBI: entry; OMA: entry
Species	Human	Mouse
Entrez	27344	30052
Ensembl	ENSG00000102109	ENSMUSG00000039278
UniProt	Q9UHG2	Q9QXV0
RefSeq (mRNA)	NM_013271	NM_013892
RefSeq (protein)	NP_037403	NP_038920
Location (UCSC)	Chr X: 48.83 – 48.84 Mb	Chr X: 7.79 – 7.79 Mb
PubMed search
- Wikidata
View/Edit Human	View/Edit Mouse

Proprotein convertase subtilisin/kexin type 1 inhibitor is a protein by the name of proSAAS that in humans is encoded by the PCSK1N gene.

== Function ==
This protein is expressed largely in cells possessing a regulated secretory pathway, such as endocrine/neuroendocrine cells and neurons. The intact proSAAS protein, as well as the carboxyy-terminal peptide containing the inhibitory hexapeptide LLRVKR, functions as an inhibitor of prohormone convertase 1/3, which accomplishes the initial proteolytic cleavage of peptide precursors. ProSAAS is further processed at the N- and C-termini into multiple short peptides, leaving the central segment intact. This central, unprocessed portion of the protein may function as a neural- and endocrine-specific chaperone due to its potent ability to block the aggregation of beta amyloid and alpha synuclein in vitro, and to block oligomer cytotoxicity in cells. Recent data show that nigral proSAAS expression blocks the deterioration of the striatonigral pathway in a synuclein rat model of Parkinson's disease. ProSAAS also oligomerizes and undergoes liquid-liquid phase separation. Differential expression of this gene may be associated with obesity.
