= Sudomotor =

Autonomic nervous system control of sweat gland activity

Sudomotor function refers to the autonomic nervous system control of sweat gland activity in response to various environmental and individual factors. Sweat production is a vital thermoregulatory mechanism used by the body to prevent heat-related illness as the evaporation of sweat is the body's most effective method of heat reduction and the only cooling method available when the air temperature rises above skin temperature. In addition, sweat plays key roles in grip, microbial defense, and wound healing.

== Physiology ==
Human sweat glands are primarily classified as either eccrine or apocrine glands. Eccrine glands open directly onto the surface of the skin, while apocrine glands open into hair follicles. Eccrine glands are the predominant sweat gland in the human body with numbers totaling up to 4 million. They are located within the reticular dermal layer of the skin and distributed across nearly the entire surface of the body with the largest numbers occurring in the palms and soles.

Eccrine sweat is secreted in response to both emotional and thermal stimulation. Eccrine glands are primarily innervated by small-diameter, unmyelinated class C-fibers from postganglionic sympathetic cholinergic neurons. Increases in body and skin temperature are detected by visceral and peripheral thermoreceptors, which send signals via class C and Aδ-fiber afferent somatic neurons through the lateral spinothalamic tract to the preoptic nucleus of the hypothalamus for processing. In addition, there are warm-sensitive neurons located within the preoptic nucleus that detect increases in core body temperature. Efferent pathways then descend ipsilaterally from the hypothalamus through the pons and medulla to preganglionic sympathetic cholinergic neurons in the intermediolateral column of the spinal cord. The preganglionic neurons synapse with postganglionic cholinergic sudomotor (and to a lesser extent adrenergic) neurons in the paravertebral sympathetic ganglia. When the action potential reaches the axon terminal of the postganglionic neuron, acetylcholine is released which binds and activates muscarinic M3 receptors on the basolateral membrane of the clear cells in the secretory coil of the eccrine gland. This triggers the release of intracellular calcium storages and an influx of extracellular calcium which ultimately results in the movement of chloride ion (Cl^{−}), sodium ion (Na^{+}), and water into the duct lumen.

== Dysfunction ==
Impaired sudomotor function can occur in any disorder that directly and/or indirectly affects the autonomic nervous system, including diabetes mellitus, amyloidosis, infections, neurodegenerative diseases, multiple system atrophy, and pure autonomic failure. Sudomotor dysfunction can manifest as increased or decreased sweating patterns. Both patterns have the potential to affect an individual's quality of life. Excessive sweating can cause social embarrassment, while insufficient sweating can result in heat intolerance and dry skin. Depending on the severity of dyshidrosis, it may result in hyperkeratosis, rhagades, ulcerations, and poor wound healing due to altered epidermal moisturization.

Sudomotor dysfunction is one of the most common and earliest neurophysiological manifestations of small fiber neuropathies. In some cases, it may be the only detectable neurologic manifestation.

The gold standard for diagnosis of small fiber neuropathies is Intraepidermal Nerve Fiber Density (IENFD) measured from punch skin biopsies, but this procedure is invasive and inappropriate for long term follow-up. Sudomotor testing can be a valuable diagnostic tool for the early detection of small fiber neuropathies.

== Assessment ==
There are several methods available for the assessment of sudomotor function. They vary in cost, technical complexity, reproducibility, variability and the availability of normative data. However, all sudomotor function assessments are not specific for small fiber or sudomotor neuropathy, as they can also yield abnormal results from disorders of the sweat glands themselves. The following is a list of methods used in clinical practice and clinical research for sudomotor assessment.

Thermoregulatory Sweat Test (TST) and Quantitative Sudomotor Axon Reflex Test (QSART) are considered the gold standards for assessment of sudomotor function. Newer methods may offer simpler, potentially more sensitive, and more widely available alternatives for screening and monitoring in the clinic of autonomic and small fiber neuropathies, particularly those associated with diabetes.

=== Thermoregulatory sweat test ===
The thermoregulatory sweat test (TST) was developed in the 1940s by Ludwig Guttmann to measure both preganglionic and postganglionic sudomotor function objectively. The test is performed in a standardized room with the temperature preheated to 45–50 °C and humidity set to 35–40%. The patient lies unclothed on an examination table. An indicator dye is evenly applied to the ventral surface of the patient's skin excluding the eyes, ears, and perioral region. The dye changes color in response to a decrease in skin pH which occurs upon the onset of sweating as the room temperature is gradually raised. Pictures are taken to record the patient's sweating patterns. In addition, a TST% is calculated by dividing the anhidrotic skin area by the total skin area and multiplying by 100. The TST% acts as an indicator of the severity of neurologic impairment.

When used in conjunction with postganglionic sudomotor function testing, such as the quantitative sudomotor axon reflex test (QSART), it can differentiate a preganglionic lesion from a postganglionic lesion. A distal anhidrotic pattern is characteristic of length-dependent small fiber neuropathies, such as the distal symmetric polyneuropathy commonly seen in diabetic patients.

The TST has proven to be a sensitive measure of sudomotor function. However, it is time-consuming and requires a highly specialized facility with trained personnel.

=== Quantitative sudomotor axon reflex test ===
The quantitative sudomotor axon reflex test (QSART) was developed in 1983 by Phillip Low as a quantitative method for the identification of localized postganglionic sudomotor dysfunction. Three-compartment sweat capsules are placed on the forearm, proximal and distal leg, as well as the dorsum of the foot. The outer compartment of the capsule is filled with a 10% acetylcholine solution, while nitrogen gas is released steadily onto the skin within the inner compartment. The middle compartment acts as a buffer between the inner and outer compartments to prevent direct stimulation of sweat glands or leakage of the acetylcholine solution. The outflow humidity of the nitrogen gas after passing across the skin is measured by a hygrometer. Once a stable baseline of outflow humidity is reached, iontophoresis of the acetylcholine fluid is initiated by using a 2mA electric current to deliver the acetylcholine into the dermal skin layers. The acetylcholine binds to sweat glands (direct sweat response), and nicotinic and muscarinic receptors on the sudomotor nerve terminals, which transmit the action potential antidromically to axon branch points and then orthodromically to adjacent sudomotor nerves and glands (indirect sweat response).

Sweat production is measured as the change in relative humidity over time. The temporal resolution, magnitude, and onset latency of the sweat response are digitally recorded and analyzed using specialized software.

QSART is sensitive and specific for detecting postganglionic small fiber dysfunction. However, some studies have found it to have a high variability, poor reproducibility, and low diagnostic sensitivity. It is also sensitive to various factors such as caffeine and medications, and the iontophoresis procedure may cause skin irritation and discomfort. QSART requires highly specialized equipment needing regular calibration, a humidity- and temperature-controlled room, and trained personnel.

=== Electrochemical skin conductance ===
Electrochemical skin conductance (ESC) is an objective, quantitative, non-invasive method for the assessment of sudomotor function that utilizes chronoamperometry (the application of rectangular direct current (DC) pulses of varying voltage amplitudes) to electrically stimulate eccrine sweat glands, and reverse iontophoresis (the migration of electrolytes from the human sweat to the electrodes) for quantitative measurement of the resulting flow of Cl- ions.

ESC can be measured with the use of a medical device called Sudoscan.

A novel electrochemical model of the skin was devised, reproducing the behavior of chloride ions and the properties of their ion channel to develop a computational tool for measuring chloride ion flow through a sweat gland in response to an imposed voltage. In vitro electrochemical studies were then carried out in conventional three-electrode cells to identify the origin of currents measured upon the application of low voltage potentials with variable amplitudes to stainless steel electrodes applied to the skin during clinical tests. These studies also evaluated the influence of different parameters in sweat (e.g., urea, lactate) on the obtained currents. These studies formed the basis for the ESC methodology of measuring sudomotor function.

The flow of Cl^{−} ions in the sweat secreted from the activated sweat glands are captured by the anode. This process is repeated twice for the feet and twice for the hands with the right and left electrodes alternating as the anode and cathode. A conductance deduced from the resulting current between the electrodes and the voltages is reported as ESC, measured in microsiemens (μS), and is proportional to the Cl^{−} flow to the skin surface, that is to say the ability to secrete Cl^{−} ions by eccrine glands, thus providing a quantitative measurement of sudomotor function.

The measurement requires no specific patient preparation or medical personnel training. The test lasts less than 3 minutes, and is innocuous and non-invasive.

In general, decreased ESC values indicate a higher risk of sudomotor dysfunction, and thus a greater likelihood of small fiber neuropathy. Sudoscan has been shown to be useful in the detection of small fiber neuropathy in patients with and without type 2 diabetes mellitus (T2DM) with a sensitivity of 77 to 87% and a specificity of 67 to 92%, as well as in the screening of diabetic nephropathy. Sudoscan has been compared with other reference tests including Heart Rate Variability (HRV) indices, intraepidermal nerve fiber density, sweat gland nerve fiber density and quantitative sudomotor axon reflex testing (QSART). In addition to diabetes, low ESC values have been reported in association with increased severity of diabetic kidney disease and metabolic syndrome. It has also been shown to be sensitive to change after different interventions in subjects with T2DM. ESC measurements are highly reproducible. Studies have shown ESC values to be dependent on ethnicity. For that purpose, normative reference values have been established on a total of 1,350 healthy participants. Normative ESC values have also been established for pediatric age groups, and it has been demonstrated that ESC values begin to decrease in the eighth decade of life. ESC has the potential to be a useful tool for detecting small fiber neuropathies. It is highly sensitive, rapid, more accessible and less technically complex than current gold standard sudomotor function tests, and causes minimal-to-no patient discomfort, so very suitable for routine use.

=== Neuropad ===
Neuropad utilizes an adhesive pad with a cobalt (II) salt indicator that changes color from blue to pink in the presence of moisture due to the hydration of cobalt ions. One pad is applied to the plantar surface of each foot in between the 1st and 2nd metatarsal heads. The pad is kept on each foot for ten minutes and the final color is recorded. A full change in color from blue to pink is considered a normal sweat response, while an absent or incomplete color change is considered abnormal.

The strengths of Neuropad are its high sensitivity, cost-effectiveness, and its potential as an at-home test. However, Neuropad has lower specificity, is not recommended for children and patients over the age of 70, and is sensitive to certain medications.

=== Silicone imprint method ===
Like QSART, silicone imprint utilizes the principles of iontophoresis to measure the axon-reflex sweat response; however, unlike QSART, it allows for spatial but not temporal resolution of the sweat response. Following iontophoresis of a cholinergic agonist, a thin layer of silicone is applied to the tested skin area until polymerization is complete (about 5 minutes). The silicone imprints are then analyzed, either by microscope or computer-assisted analysis, for sweat droplet size, number, and distribution, and compared to lower limits of normal.

The silicone imprint method is relatively inexpensive and can be performed in non-specialized testing centers; however, the method is prone to artifacts caused by residual hair and dirt, as well as skin surface texture and air bubble formation; the accuracy of the results depends on the silicone material used; the processing of the sweat impressions is time consuming; and the technique requires standardization.

=== Quantitative direct and indirect test ===
The quantitative direct and indirect test (QDIRT) was developed in 2008 by Christopher Gibbons and colleagues as a means for the evaluation of postganglionic sudomotor function outside of specialized autonomic testing centers. It combines elements of TST, QSART, and the silicone imprint method. Similar to QSART, it involves the iontophoresis of 10% acetylcholine solution to induce axon-reflex sweating; however, it utilizes an automated imaging analysis software that is less technically complex. Prior to iontophoresis, the skin is dried and covered with an indicator dye consisting of povidone-iodine mixed with corn starch and mineral oil. The indicator dye changes color with the onset of sweating. Digital photographs of the color change are recorded every 15 seconds over approximately 7 minutes. Spatial and temporal analysis of sweat droplets as well as direct and indirect sweat response are measured.

Although QDIRT is less technically demanding than QSART or TST, it still requires trained staff and an environmentally controlled room; iontophoresis may cause skin irritation or burning; the skin areas studied using QDIRT are not pre-defined, thus limiting the interindividual comparability of the test; and little normative or performance data are available.

=== Sensitive sweat test ===
The sensitive sweat test (SST) was developed by Adam Loavenbruck and colleagues in 2017 for the evaluation of individual sweat glands. It allows for the quantification of sweat from each individual sweat gland, as well as their location and distribution, thus providing both temporal and spatial resolution. The procedure is initiated by the iontophoresis of 0.5% pilocarpine solution over a 2.25 cm^{2} skin area, which stimulates the underlying sweat glands directly through the activation of muscarinic M3 receptors. Immediately following iontophoresis, the skin is dried, and then covered with a 10% povidone-iodine solution. At the onset of sweating, the reaction of sweat with the povidone-iodine solution and corn starch results in the appearance of a black spot. A customized miniature camera can follow the secretions of up to 400 sweat glands at a time for up to 60 seconds, analyzing the enlargement rate and area of each spot. The test is then repeated for replicate analysis.

The procedure is relatively quick and the camera is portable. However, further testing is needed to establish normative data and to confirm its utility in autonomic testing. As the test lacks an axon-reflex response, it has a limited ability to assess nerve fiber function.

=== Sympathetic skin response ===
Sympathetic skin response (SSR) refers to the change in skin resistance to electrical conduction associated with the sympathetic activation of sudomotor function in response to external or internal stimuli, such as electrical stimulation, deep breathing, and mental stress. It is mediated by a poorly understood somato-sympathetic reflex with spinal, bulbar, and suprabulbar components. The SSR is frequently utilized in psychophysiological studies and is a well-known component of the polygraph test.

The test is performed using standard electromyography (EMG) equipment in a lightly dimmed, humidity- and temperature-controlled room. A surface electrode is positioned on the patient's palm or sole, along with a reference electrode on the dorsal side of the same body area. A change in skin potential is then induced either through electrical stimulation or deep breathing. The recorded SSR is then plotted on a graph and analyzed for presence or absence, latency, and amplitude.

The SSR is thought to be mainly influenced by the electrolyte content of sweat secreted from eccrine glands. In addition, there is significant intra-individual and inter-individual variability, and SSR declines with age and is commonly absent in individuals over the age of 50. SSR is only considered a surrogate marker of sudomotor function and its results should be interpreted in the context of other sudomotor testing.

=== Spoon test ===
The spoon test, developed in 1964 by Ernest Bors, relies on assessment of the smooth movement of the convex side of a spoon along the surface of the patient's skin. In patients with sudomotor dysfunction, the spoon will slide in a smooth and uninterrupted fashion. Conversely, the spoon's movement in normal controls will be frequently interrupted by the presence of sweat on the skin.

The spoon test is inexpensive, easy to perform, but subjective and not quantitative.

=== Sweat gland nerve fiber density ===
Sweat gland nerve fiber density (SGNFD) can be quantified in skin biopsies taken from the distal leg, distal thigh, and proximal thigh prepared for standard analysis of intraepidermal nerve fiber density (IENFD). Nerve fibers innervating sweat glands are stained with Protein Gene Product 9.5 and quantified using manual morphometry with light microscopy.

SGNFD can potentially be used as a surrogate anatomical marker for sudomotor function. However, it is not a direct assessment of the sweat response, and normative data must be established.

=== Physical examination ===
Inspection of the patient's skin, particularly on the lower extremities, in conjunction with a thorough medical history, can provide valuable information regarding the possible presence of sudomotor dysfunction. Evidence of altered skin hydration, such as hyperkeratosis, excessive skin dander, rhagades, and ulcers, can be suggestive of sudomotor dysfunction. Presence of intense foot odor may be another presentation.

== See also ==
- Sweat gland
- Eccrine sweat gland
- Electrochemical skin conductance
