= Hidradenitis suppurativa =

Human disease

- Other names: Acne inversa, apocrine acne, Verneuil's disease, Velpeau's disease
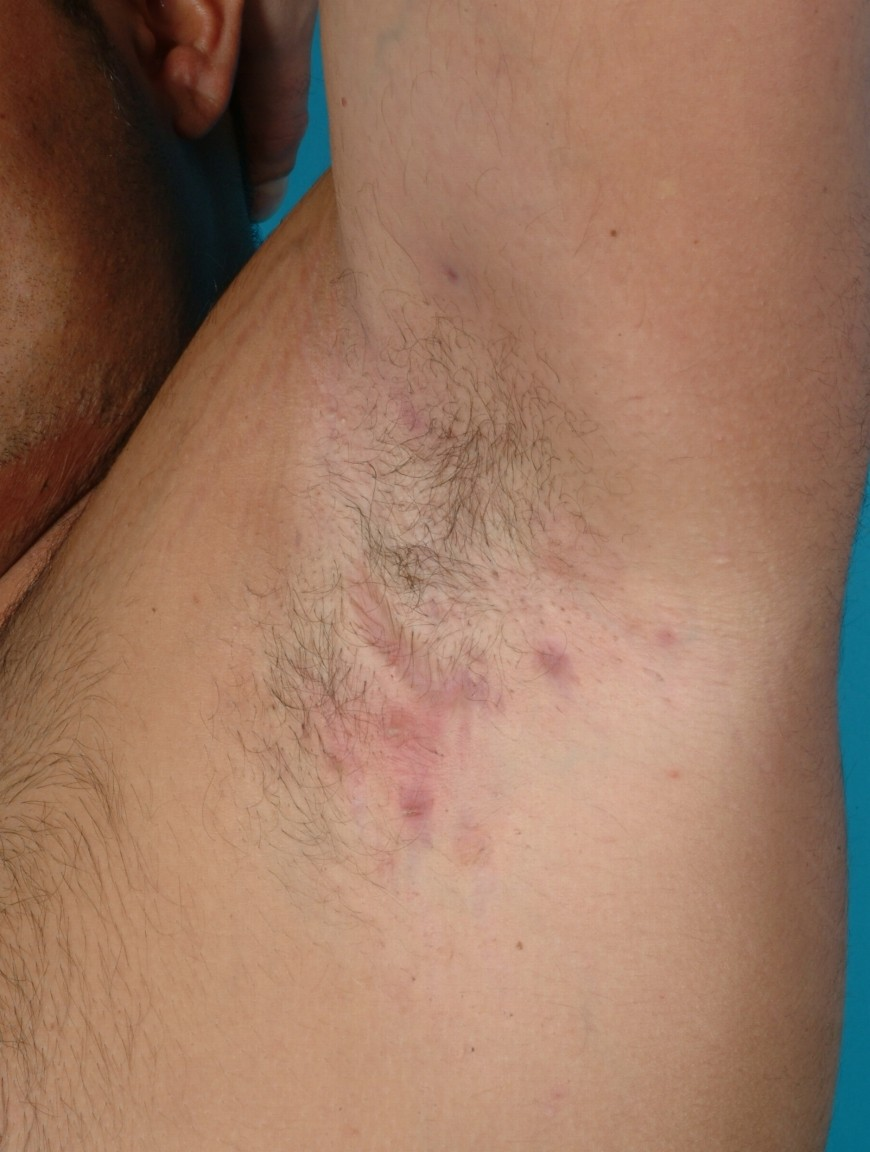
- Hidradenitis suppurativa (Hurley's stage II) in the left armpit
- Specialty: Dermatology
- Symptoms: Multiple inflamed and swollen skin lesions
- Usual onset: Childhood and young adulthood
- Duration: Long-term
- Types: Stage I, II, III
- Causes: Unknown
- Diagnostic method: Based on symptoms
- Differential diagnosis: Acne, acne conglobata, pilonidal cysts
- Treatment: Warm baths, laser therapy, surgery
- Medication: Secukinumab, antibiotics, immunosuppressive medication
- Frequency: 1–4% of people, when mild cases are included
- Deaths: Rare

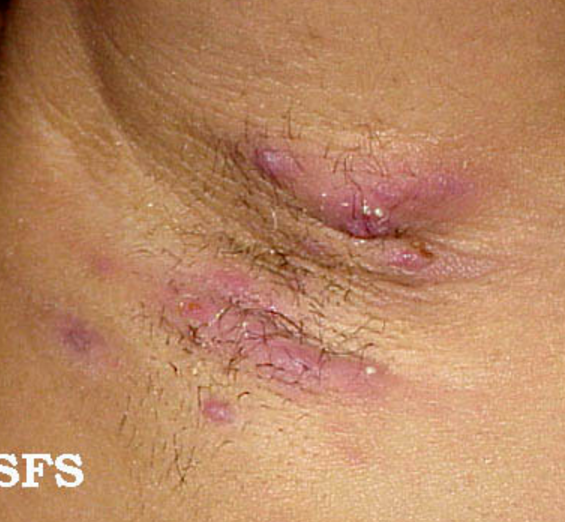
A case of hidradenitis suppurativa

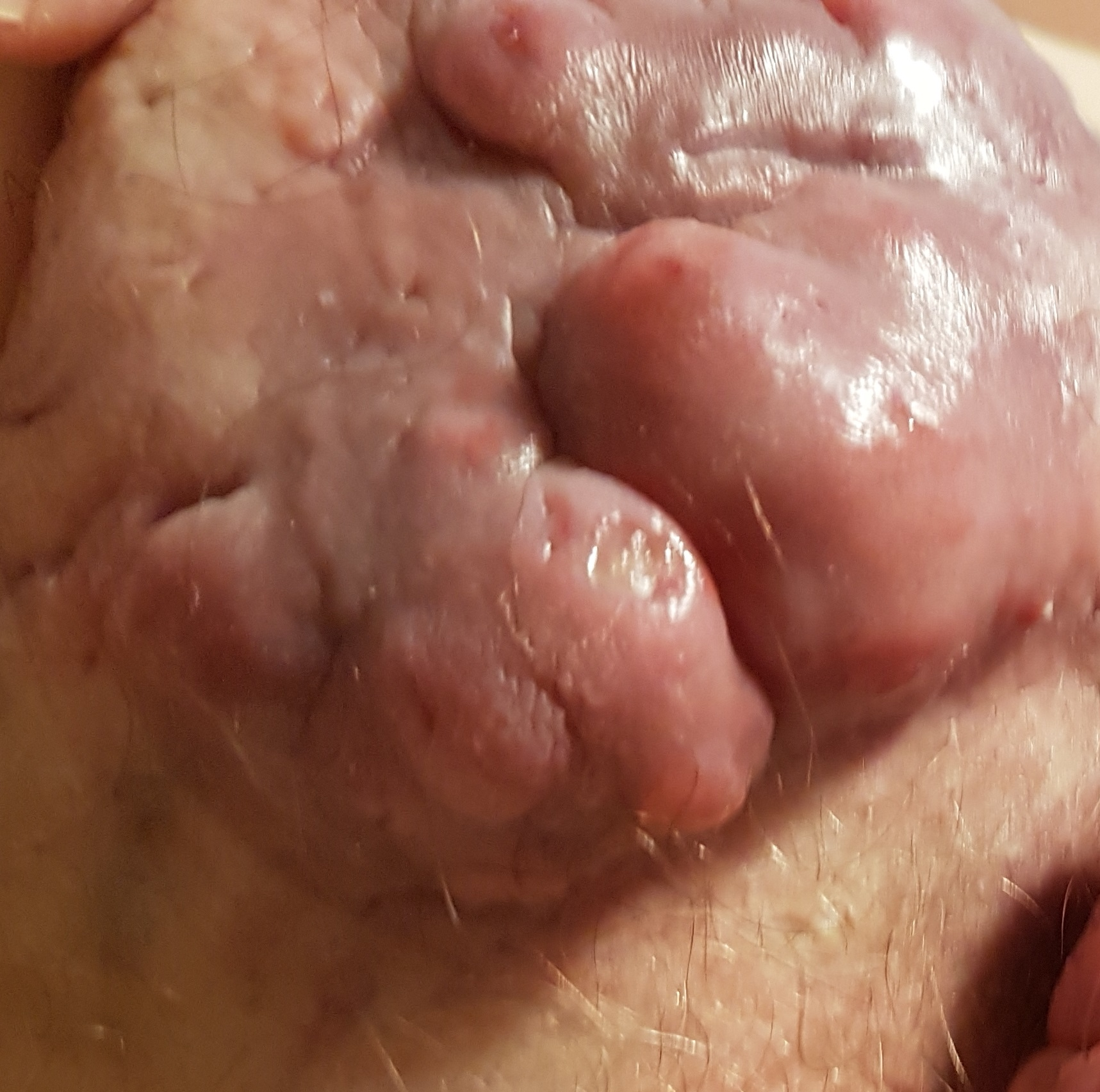
Hidradenitis suppurativa can take the form of growths on the skin that are extremely painful and debilitating.

Hidradenitis suppurativa (HS), sometimes known as acne inversa or Verneuil's disease, is a long-term dermatological condition characterized by the occurrence of inflamed and swollen lumps. These are typically painful and break open, releasing fluid or pus. The areas most commonly affected are the underarms, under the breasts, perineum, buttocks, and the groin. Scar tissue remains after healing. HS may significantly limit many everyday activities, for instance, walking, hugging, moving, and sitting down. Sitting disability may occur in patients with lesions in the sacral, gluteal, perineal, femoral, groin or genital regions. Prolonged periods of sitting down can also worsen the condition of the skin of these patients.

The exact cause is usually unclear but believed to involve a combination of genetic and environmental factors. About a third of people with the disease have an affected family member. Other risk factors include obesity and smoking. The condition is not caused by an infection, poor hygiene, or the use of deodorant. Instead, it is believed to be caused by hair follicles being obstructed, (Note: See section "Genetic Changes") with the nearby apocrine sweat glands being strongly implicated in this obstruction. The sweat glands may or may not be inflamed. Diagnosis is based on the symptoms.

No cure is known, though surgical excision with wet-to-dry dressings, proper wound care, and warm baths or showering with a pulse-jet shower may be used in those with mild disease. Cutting open the lesions to allow them to drain does not result in significant benefit. While antibiotics are commonly used, evidence for their efficacy is poor. Immunosuppressive medication may also be tried. In those with more severe disease, laser therapy or surgery to remove the affected skin may be viable. Rarely, a skin lesion may develop into skin cancer.

If mild cases of HS are included, then the estimate of its frequency is from 1–4% of the population. Women are three times more likely to be diagnosed with it than men. Onset is typically in young adulthood and may become less common after 50 years old. It was first described between 1833 and 1839 by French anatomist Alfred Velpeau.

== Terminology ==
Although hidradenitis suppurativa is often called acne inversa, it is not a form of acne. Hidradenitis suppurativa lacks the core defining features of acne, such as the presence of closed comedones and increased sebum production.

== Causes ==
The exact cause of hidradenitis suppurativa remains unknown, (Note: See section "Genetic Changes") and there has, in the recent past, been notable disagreement among experts in this regard. The condition, however, likely stems from both genetic and environmental causes. Specifically, an immune-mediated pathology has been proposed, although environmental factors have not been ruled out.

Lesions will occur in any body area with hair follicles, and/or sweat glands. Areas such as the axilla, groin, and perineal region are more commonly involved. This theory includes most of these potential indicators:

- Post-pubescent individuals
- Blocked hair follicles or blocked apocrine sweat glands
- Excessive sweating
- Androgen dysfunction
- Genetic disorders that alter cell structure

The historical understanding of the disease suggests dysfunctional apocrine glands or dysfunctional hair follicles, possibly triggered by a blocked gland, which creates inflammation, pain, and a swollen lesion.

=== Triggering factors ===
Several triggering factors should be taken into consideration:

- Obesity is an exacerbating rather than a triggering factor, through mechanical irritation, occlusion, and skin maceration.
- Tight clothing, and clothing made of heavy, non-breathable materials
- Deodorants, depilation products, shaving of the affected area – their association with HS is still an ongoing debate among researchers.
- Drugs, in particular oral contraceptive pills, cigarette smoking, and lithium.
- Hot and especially humid climates.
- Stress

=== Predisposing factors ===
- Genetic factors: an autosomal dominant inheritance pattern has been proposed.
- Endocrine factors:
  - Sex hormones, especially an excess of androgens, are thought to be involved, although the apocrine glands are not sensitive to these hormones. Women often have outbreaks before their menstrual period and after pregnancy; HS severity usually decreases during pregnancy and after menopause.
  - Diabetes mellitus is common in hidradenitis suppurativa and seems to be a risk factor.

Some cases have been found to result from mutations in the NCSTN, PSEN1, or PSENEN genes. The genes produce proteins that are all components of a complex called gamma- (γ-) secretase. This complex cuts apart (cleaves) many different proteins, which is a crucial step in several chemical signaling pathways. One of these pathways, known as notch signaling, is essential for the normal maturation and division of hair follicle cells and other types of skin cells. Notch signaling influences normal immune system function. Studies suggest mutations in the NCSTN, PSEN1, or PSENEN genes impair notch signaling in hair follicles. Although little is known about the mechanism, abnormal notch signaling appears to promote the development of nodules and lead to skin inflammation. In addition, the composition of the intestinal microflora and as a consequence dietary patterns appear to play a role. Although dysbiosis of the cutaneous microbiome, apparent in HS, is not observed, the concurrent presence of inflammatory gut and skin diseases has led to the hypothesis of a gut-skin axis in which gut microbiota is implicated. Indeed, analysis of bacterial taxa in fecal samples from HS patients supports the possibility of a role for intestinal microbial alterations in this chronic inflammatory skin disease.

Hidradenitis suppurativa has also been discussed as a possible manifestation of some inborn errors of immunity. A 2026 review noted overlap between HS pathogenesis and monogenic disorders affecting epithelial–innate immune interactions, Th17 differentiation, neutrophil function, and inflammasome regulation, including STAT3-associated hyper-IgE syndrome, STAT1 gain-of-function disease, chronic granulomatous disease, and selected autoinflammatory syndromes.

Precocious puberty is more common among children and adolescents with hidradenitis suppurativa (HS) compared to those without the condition, according to a recent case-control study.

An analysis of the Explorys database revealed that pediatric patients with precocious puberty have double the risk of developing HS, even after adjusting for factors like demographic characteristics and body mass index (BMI).

== Diagnosis ==
Early diagnosis is essential in avoiding tissue damage. However, HS is often misdiagnosed or diagnosed late due to healthcare professionals not being aware of the condition or people not consulting with a physician. Globally, the diagnosis is delayed more than 7 years in average after symptoms appear. This is much longer than with other skin conditions.

=== Stages ===
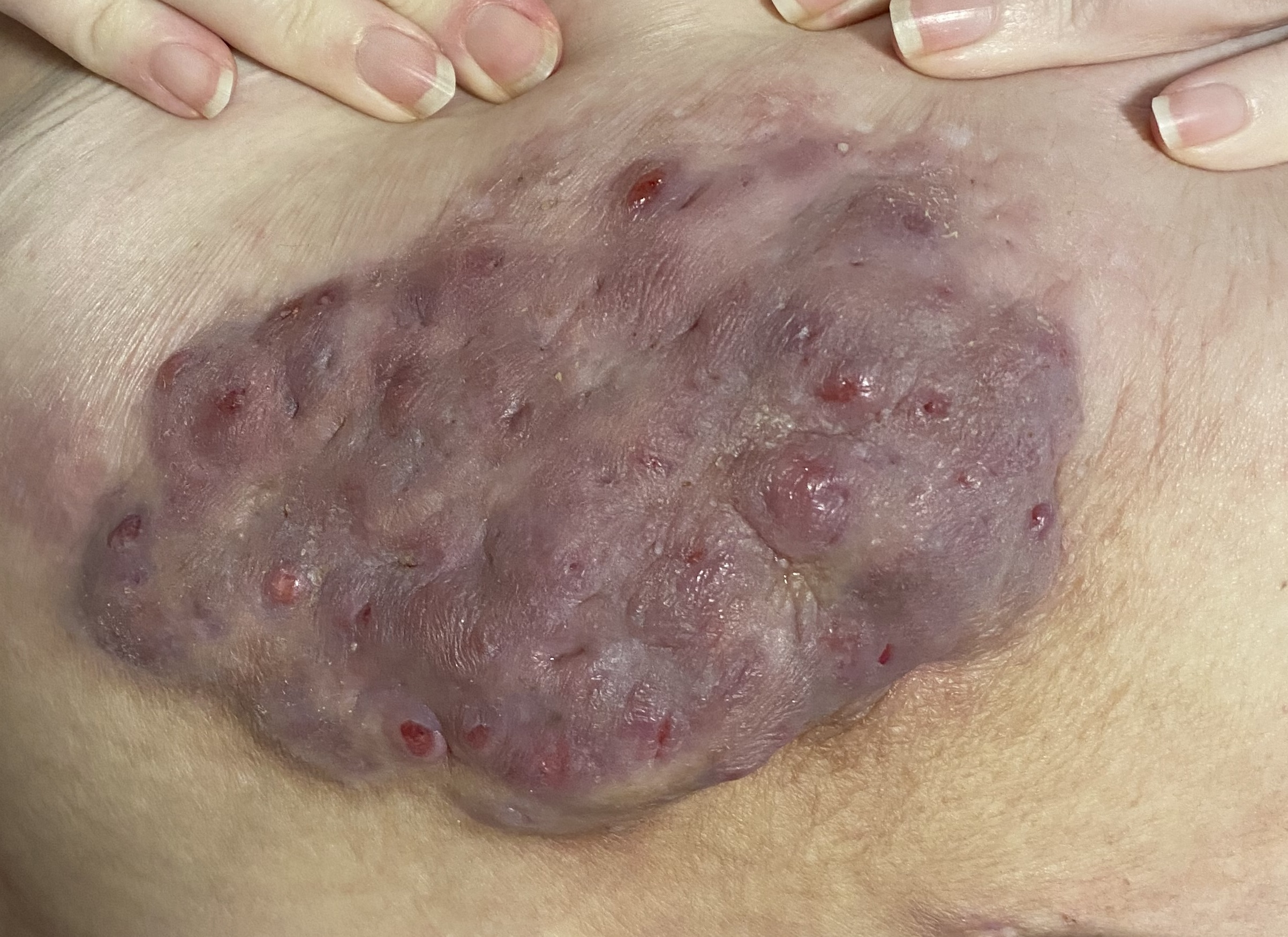
Hidradenitis suppurativa stage III on abdomen: Skin is red and inflamed, constantly draining a malodorous blood/pus mixture. Pain is severe.

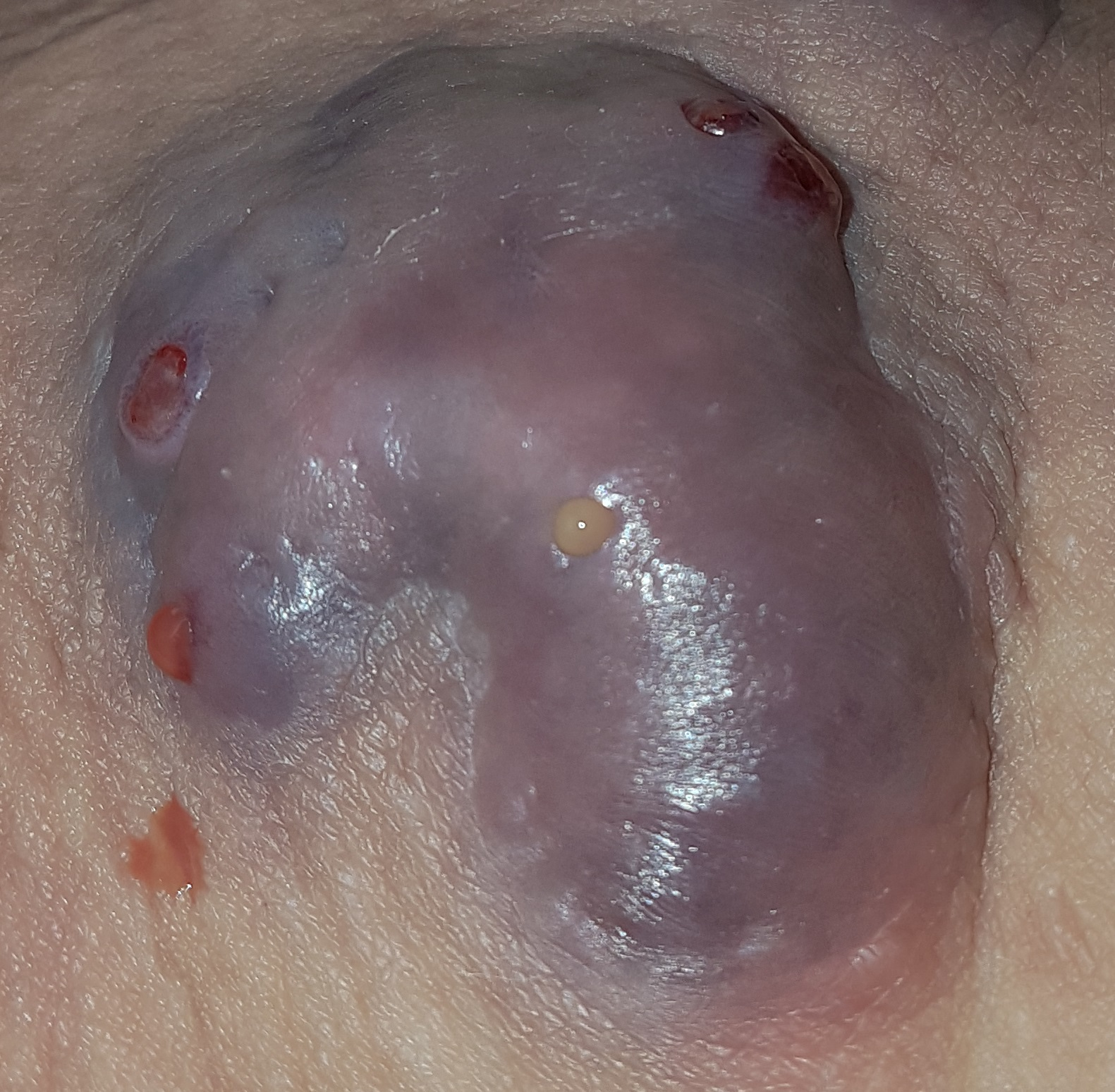
Hidradenitis suppurativa. This lesion is about 4 inches across.

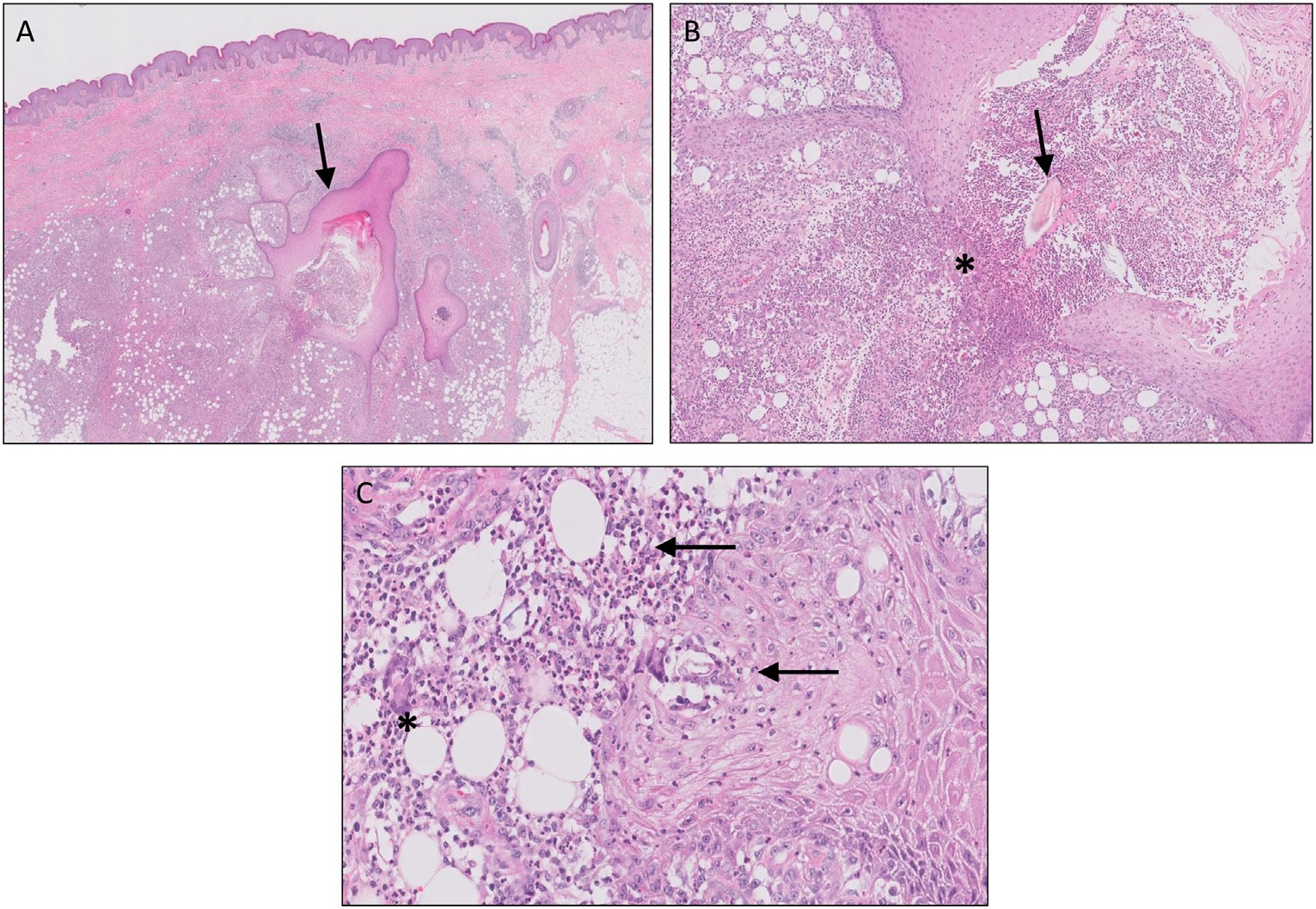
Micrograph of hidradenitis suppurativa: Sinus tracts [(A), arrow], active inflammation, and rupture [(B), asterisks] of the follicular epithelium with "floating" hair fragments (B), arrowSubsequently, a secondary inflammatory response is induced with an influx of numerous neutrophils [(C), arrows] and granulomatous foreign body reaction with giant cells [(C), asterisks].

Hidradenitis suppurativa presents itself in three stages. Due to the large spectrum of clinical severity and the severe impact on quality of life, a reliable method for evaluating HS severity is needed.

==== Hurley's staging system ====
Hurley's staging system was the first classification system proposed and is still in use for the classification of patients with skin diseases (i.e., psoriasis, HS, acne). Hurley separated patients into three groups based largely on the presence and extent of cicatrization and sinuses. It has been used as a basis for clinical trials in the past and to determine appropriate therapy for patients. These three stages are based on Hurley's staging system, which relies on the subjective extent of the diseased tissue. Hurley's three stages of hidradenitis suppurativa are:

Stage	Characteristics
I	Solitary or multiple isolated abscess formation without scarring or sinus tracts (A few minor sites with rare inflammation; may be mistaken for acne.)
II	Recurrent abscesses, single or multiple widely separated lesions, with sinus tract formation (Frequent inflammation restricts movement and may require minor surgery such as incision and drainage.)
III	Diffuse or broad involvement across a regional area with multiple interconnected sinus tracts and abscesses (Inflammation of sites to the size of golf balls, or sometimes baseballs; scarring develops, including subcutaneous tracts of infection – see fistula. Obviously, patients at this stage may be unable to function.)

==== Sartorius staging system ====
The Sartorius staging system is more sophisticated than Hurley's. Sartorius et al. suggested that the Hurley system is not sophisticated enough to assess treatment effects in clinical trials during research. This classification allows for better dynamic monitoring of the disease severity in individual patients. The elements of this staging system are:

- Anatomic regions involved (axilla, groin, gluteal, or other region or inframammary region left or right)
- Number and types of lesions involved (abscesses, nodules, fistulas or sinuses, scars, points for lesions of all regions involved)
- The distance between lesions, in particular, the longest distance between two relevant lesions (i.e., nodules and fistulas in each region or size if only one lesion is present)
- The presence of normal skin in between lesions (i.e., if all lesions are separated by normal skin)

Points are accumulated in the above categories and added to give a regional and total score. In addition, the authors recommend adding a visual analog scale for pain or using the dermatology life quality index (DLQI, or the 'skindex') when assessing HS.

== Treatment ==
Treatment depends upon the presentation and severity of the disease. Due to the poorly studied nature of the disease, the effectiveness of medications and therapies was unclear. Clear and sensitive communication from health care professionals, and social and psychological interventions can help manage the emotional impact of the condition and aid necessary lifestyle changes. In May 2023, the European Commission (EC) approved Cosentyx (secukinumab) for active moderate to severe hidradenitis suppurativa in adults.

Other possible treatments include the following:

=== Cryotherapy ===
Cryotherapy has demonstrated efficacy against the disease, with 88% of persistent lesions resolving in a clinical trial of 23 patients.

=== Lifestyle ===
Warm baths may be tried in those with mild disease. Weight loss and smoking cessation are recommended.

=== Medication ===
- Antibiotics: taken by mouth, these are used for their anti-inflammatory properties rather than to treat infection. Most effective is a combination of rifampicin and clindamycin given concurrently for 2–3 months. Popular antibiotics also include tetracycline and minocycline. Topical clindamycin has been shown to have an effect in double-blind placebo-controlled studies. In a retrospective review and telephone survey, intravenous ertapenem therapy showed clinical improvement with 80.3% of subjects reporting medium to high satisfaction and 90.8% would recommend ertapenem to other patients.
- Corticosteroid injections, also known as intralesional steroids, can be useful for localized disease if the drug can be prevented from escaping via the sinuses.
- Antiandrogen therapy, hormonal therapy with antiandrogenic medications such as spironolactone, flutamide, cyproterone acetate, ethinylestradiol, finasteride, dutasteride, and metformin, are effective in clinical studies. However, the quality of available evidence is low and does not presently allow for robust evidence-based recommendations.
- Intravenous infusion or subcutaneous injection of anti-inflammatory (TNF inhibitors; anti-TNF-alpha) drugs such as infliximab, and etanercept This use of these drugs is not currently approved in the United States by the Food and Drug Administration (FDA) and is somewhat controversial.
- Biologics: Various biologics can improve HS lesions. Specifically adalimumab at weekly intervals is useful. Adalimumab and secukinumab are both approved by the FDA for the treatment of HS as of 2023.
- Topical isotretinoin is usually ineffective in people with HS, and is more commonly known as a medication for the treatment of acne vulgaris. Individuals affected by HS who responded to isotretinoin treatment tended to have milder cases of the condition.
- Zinc and nicotinamide, at doses of 90 mg and 30 mg respectively, have shown efficacy against mild to moderate hidradenitis suppurativa in a controlled retrospective clinical trial.

=== Surgery ===
When the process becomes chronic, wide surgical excision is the procedure of choice.

Wounds in the affected area do not heal by secondary intention, and immediate or delayed application of a split-thickness skin graft is an option. Another option is covering the defect with a perforator flap. With this technique, the (mostly totally excised) defect is covered with tissue from an area nearby. For example, the axilla with a fully excised defect of 15 × 7 cm can be covered with a thoracodorsal artery perforator flap.. A less invasive excision procedure called skin-tissue-sparing excision with electrosurgical peeling or "STEEP" has also been developed for treating moderate to severe disease.

=== Laser hair removal ===
The 1064 nm wavelength (near-infrared) laser for hair removal may aid in the treatment of HS. A randomized control study has shown improvement in HS lesions with the use of a Nd:YAG laser.

=== Botox injection ===
A 2022 study reported that administration of botulinum toxin resulted in either clinical improvement or improved quality of life in 96.8% (n = 30/31) of HS patients. The level of evidence was moderate. It concluded that the treatment was a safe and potentially effective alternative for hidradenitis suppurativa patients resistant to standard-of-care therapies.

== Prognosis ==
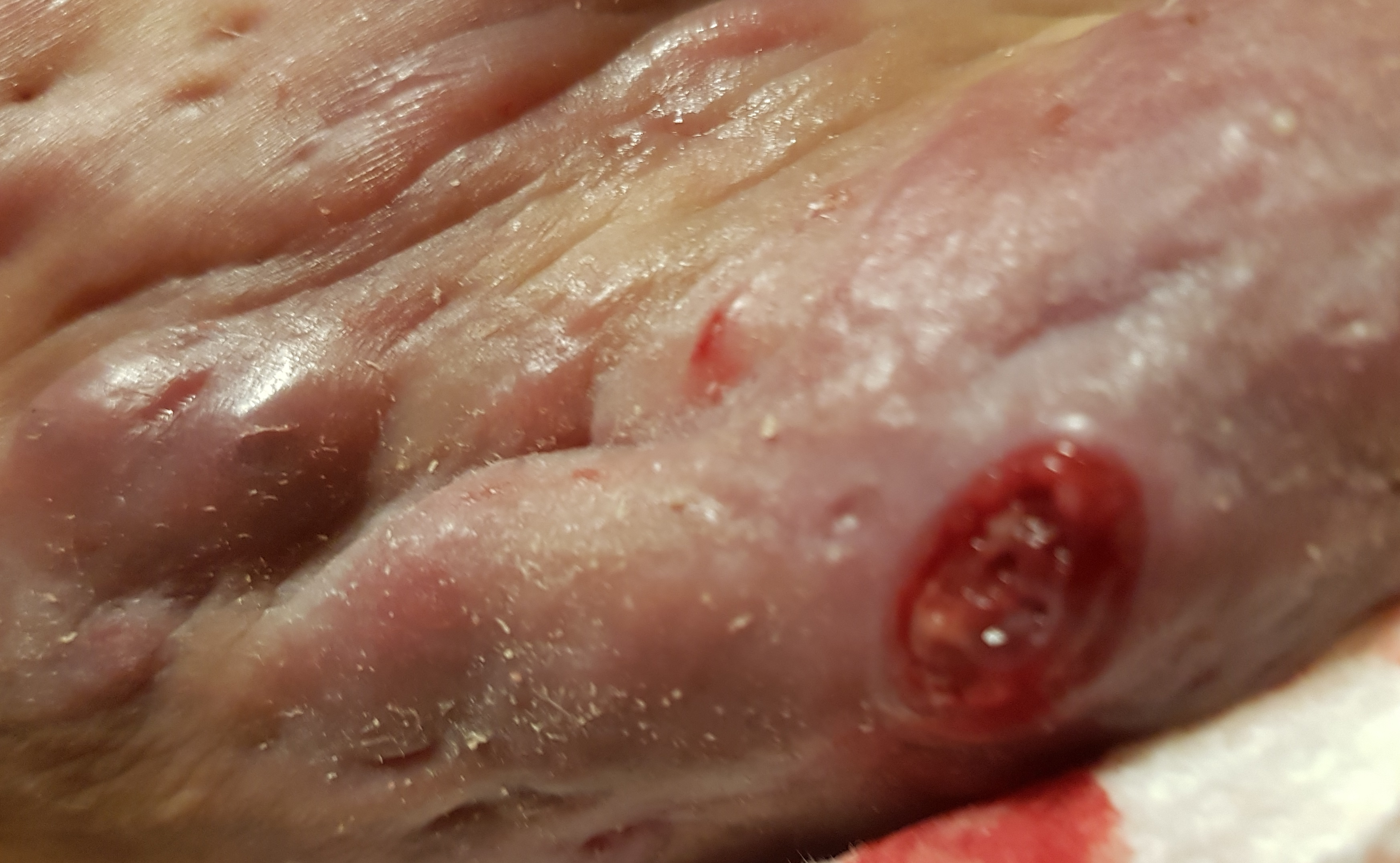
Hidradenitis suppurativa stage III. Open lesions are extremely painful.

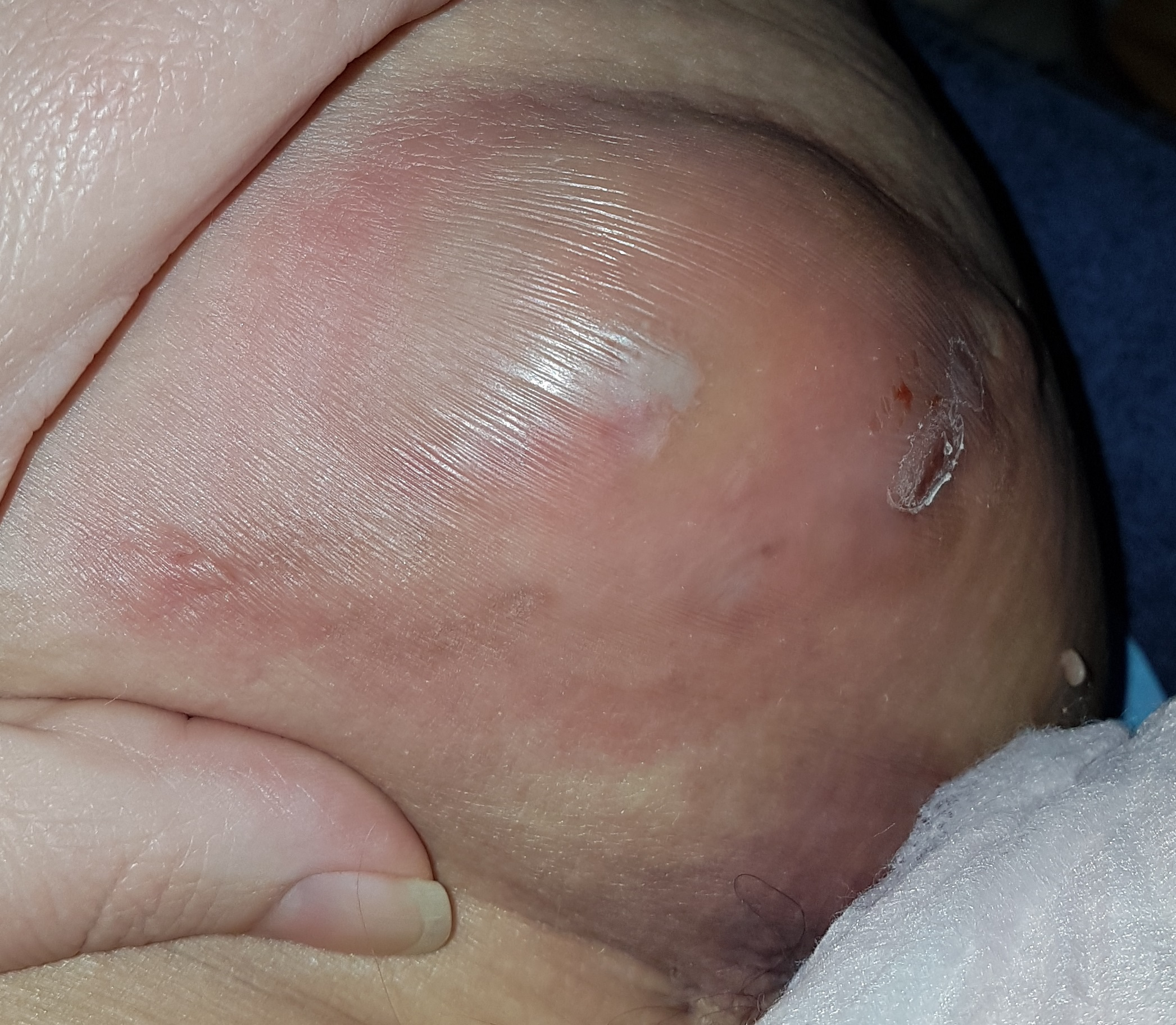
Hidradenitis suppurativa stage III. Inflamed lesion.

In stage III disease, as classified by Hurley's staging system, fistulae left undiscovered, undiagnosed, or untreated can rarely lead to the development of squamous cell carcinoma in the anus or other affected areas. Other stage III chronic sequelae may also include anemia, multi-localized infections, amyloidosis, and arthropathy. Stage III complications have been known to lead to sepsis, but clinical data are still uncertain.

=== Comorbidities and complications ===
Endocrine diseases are more common in people who have HS. Diabetes mellitus may be both a causal factor contributing to the evolution and/or severity of HS and a consequence of inflammation in HS. Thyroid disorders are also more common in patients with HS.

- Contractures and reduced mobility of the lower limbs and axillae due to fibrosis and scarring occur. Severe lymphedema may develop in the lower limbs.
- Local and systemic infections (meningitis, bronchitis, pneumonia, etc.) are seen, which may even progress to sepsis.
- Higher risk for diabetes mellitus, high blood pressure, heart attacks, and metabolic syndrome. Persons affected by HS have reduced insulin sensitivity (SPINA-GR), which, if uncompensated by increased pancreatic beta cell function, can result in prediabetes and overt diabetes mellitus. Treatment of HS may contribute to remission of diabetes.
- HS is associated with an increased risk of polyendocrine metabolic ovarian syndrome (PMOS).
- Interstitial keratitis
- Pyoderma gangrenosum
- Pilonidal disease
- Dyslipidemia
- Anal, rectal, or urethral fistulae
- Normochromic or hypochromic anemia
- People with HS may be at increased risk for autoimmune disorders, including ankylosing spondylitis, rheumatoid arthritis, psoriatic arthritis, and inflammatory bowel diseases, such as Crohn's disease.
- Squamous cell carcinoma has been found on rare occasions in chronic hidradenitis suppurativa of the anogenital region. The mean time to the onset of this type of lesion is 10 years or more and the tumors are usually highly aggressive.
- Tumors of the lung and oral cavity, and liver cancer
- Hypoproteinemia and amyloidosis, which can lead to kidney failure and death
- Seronegative and usually asymmetric arthropathy: pauciarticular arthritis, polyarthritis/polyarthralgia syndrome.

=== Impact on mental health ===
HS is a painful and socially isolating condition that leads to a negative impact on mental health as well. A 2020 meta-analysis found that 21% of people with HS have depression, including major depression, and 12% have anxiety, including generalized anxiety disorder and a higher risk of suicide. A 2020 study found that people with HS have suicide rates more than double the rates in controls, and also have a higher risk of attempting suicide.

== Epidemiology ==
=== Prevalence ===
Estimates of the prevalence of HS vary worldwide, and there is no accepted generalization. In the US, the prevalence is estimated to be 0.1% while in Europe it is thought to be 1% or more.

==== Sex ====
In North America and Europe, women are three times more likely to have HS. However, in South Korea, men are twice as likely to have HS.

==== Age ====
HS is the most prevalent in people in their 20s and 30s.

== History ==
- From 1833 to 1839, in a series of three publications, Velpeau identified and described a disease now known as hidradenitis suppurativa.
- In 1854, Aristide Verneuil described hidradenitis suppurativa as hidrosadénite phlegmoneuse ("phlegmonous hidrosadenitis"). This is how HS obtained the name "Verneuil's disease".
- In 1922, Paul Schiefferdecker hypothesized a pathogenic link between "acne inversa" and human sweat glands.
- In 1956, Pillsbury et al. coined the term follicular occlusion triad for the common association of hidradenitis suppurativa, acne conglobata and dissecting cellulitis of the scalp. Modern clinical research still employs Pillsbury's terminology for these conditions' descriptions.
- In 1975, Plewig and Kligman, following Pillsbury's research path, modified the "acne triad", replacing it with the "acne tetrad: acne triad, plus pilonidal sinus". Plewig and Kligman's research follows in Pillsbury's footsteps, offering explanations of the symptoms associated with hidradenitis suppurativa.
- In 1989, Plewig and Steger's research led them to rename hidradenitis suppurativa, calling it "acne inversa" – which is not still used today in medical terminology, although some individuals still use this outdated term.

A surgeon from Paris, Velpeau, described an unusual inflammatory process with the formation of superficial axillary, submammary, and perianal abscesses, in a series of three publications from 1833 to 1839. One of his colleagues, also located in Paris, named Verneuil, coined the term hidrosadénite phlegmoneuse about 15 years later. This name for the disease reflects the former pathogenetic model of acne inversa, which considered inflammation of sweat glands as the primary cause of hidradenitis suppurativa. In 1922, Paul Schiefferdecker suspected a pathogenic association between acne inversa and apocrine sweat glands. In 1956, Pillsbury postulated follicular occlusion as the cause of acne inversa, which they grouped together with acne conglobata and perifolliculitis capitis abscendens et suffodiens ("dissecting cellulitis of the scalp") as the "acne triad". Plewig and Kligman added another element to their acne triad, pilonidal sinus. Plewig et al. noted that this new "acne tetrad" includes all the elements found in the original "acne triad", in addition to a fourth element, pilonidal sinus. In 1989, Plewig and Steger introduced the term "acne inversa", indicating a follicular source of the disease and replacing older terms such as "Verneuil disease".

Author	Year	Findings
Velpeau	1839	First description of hidradenitis suppurativa
Verneuil	1854	"Hidrosadénite phlegmoneuse"
Pillsbury	1956	Acne triad (hidradenitis suppurativa, perifolliculitis capitis abscendens et suffodiens, acne congoblata)
Plewig & Kligman	1975	Acne tetrad (acne triad + pilonidal sinus)
Plewig & Steger	1989	Acne inversa

=== Other names ===
Hidradenitis suppurativa has been referred to by multiple names in the literature and various cultures. Some of these are also used to describe different diseases or specific instances of this disease.

- Acne conglobata – not really a synonym – this is a similar process but in classic acne areas of the chest and back
- Acne inversa – a proposed new term which has not gained widespread favor.
- Apocrine acne – an outdated term based on the disproven concept that apocrine glands are primarily involved, though many do have apocrine gland infection
- Apocrinitis – another outdated term based on the same thesis
- Fox-den disease – a term not used in medical literature, based on the deep fox den–like sinuses
- Hidradenitis supportiva – a misspelling
- Pyodermia fistulans significa – now considered archaic
- Verneuil's disease – recognizing the surgeon whose name is most often associated with the disorder as a result of his 1854–1865 studies

=== Histology ===
Author	Year	Major features
Plewig & Steger	1989	Initial hyperkeratosis of the follicular infundibulum. Bacterial super-infection and follicle rupture. Granulomatous inflammatory reaction of the connective tissue. Apocrine and eccrine sweat glands secondarily involved.
Yu & Cook	1990	Cysts and sinus tracts lined with epithelium, in part with hair shafts. Inflammation of apocrine sweat glands only if eccrine sweat glands and hair follicles are also inflamed.
Boer & Weltevreden	1996	Primary inflammation of the follicular infundibulum. Apocrine sweat glands are secondarily involved.

== Society and culture ==
=== Experiences of people with HS ===
HS can have a strong negative impact on people's lives, as well as physical and mental health. People with HS often feel stigmatized and embarrassed by their condition. Many try to hide the symptoms, which can lead to impaired relationships and social isolation. A multidisciplinary approach by healthcare professionals, social support networks, and psychological interventions can contribute to a better quality of life. Compared to other skin diseases, HS has one of the highest Dermatology Life Quality Index (DLQI) scores.
