= Penetration enhancer =

Chemical compound used in pharmaceuticals

Penetration enhancers (also called chemical penetration enhancers, absorption enhancers or sorption promotors) are chemical compounds that can facilitate the penetration of active pharmaceutical ingredients (API) into or through the poorly permeable biological membranes. These compounds are used in some pharmaceutical formulations to enhance the penetration of APIs in transdermal drug delivery and transmucosal drug delivery (for example, ocular, nasal, oral and buccal). They typically penetrate into the biological membranes and reversibly decrease their barrier properties.

== Transdermal drug delivery ==
Human skin is a very impermeable membrane that protects the body from ingress of harmful substances and prevents water loss from underlying organs. However, this seriously limits the use of skin as a site for drug administration. One of the approaches to facilitate transdermal drug delivery is the use of penetration enhancers. Many different compounds have been explored as potential penetration enhancers to facilitate transdermal drug delivery. These include dimethylsulphoxide, azones (such as laurocapram), pyrrolidones (for example 2-pyrrolidone), alcohols (ethanol and decanol), glycols (for example propylene glycol), esters (such as isopropyl myristate), surfactants, urea, various hydrocarbons and terpenes. Different potential skin site and modes of action were identified for penetration enhancement through the skin. In some cases, penetration enhancers may disrupt the packing motif of the intercellular lipid matrix or keratin domains. In other cases, drug penetration to the skin is facilitated because the penetration enhancer saturates the tissue and becomes a better system to dissolve the molecules of API.

== Ocular drug delivery ==
Topical administration to the eye is usually characterised by very poor drug bioavailability due to several natural defence mechanisms, including nasolacrymal drainage, blinking, and poor permeability of the cornea. Enhancement of the corneal permeability to drug molecules is one of the strategies to improve the efficiency of topical drug delivery to the eye. Several classes of compounds have been researched as potential penetration enhancers through ocular membranes. These include chelating agents, cyclodextrins, surfactants, bile acids and salts, and crown ethers. There are also reports on the use of cell penetrating peptides and chitosan as penetration enhancers in ocular drug delivery. The most commonly used penetration enhancers in ocular formulations are benzalkonium chloride and ethylenediamine tetraacetate (EDTA). Benzalkonium chloride is often used as an antimicrobial preservative in eye drops and EDTA is used as a chelating agent.

== Nasal drug delivery ==
Cyclodextrins, chitosan, some surfactants, bile acids and salts, sodium tauro-24,25-dihydro-fusidate, and phospholipids were reported as penetration enhancers in nasal drug delivery both for humans and equines. Chitosan is one of the most widely researched penetration enhancers in nasal drug delivery and it enhances the penetration of drugs by opening the tight junctions in the cell membranes.

== Oral drug delivery ==
Penetration enhancers have been applied to improve the absorption of poorly permeable, hydrophilic drugs or macromolecules. Permeation enhancers that have been used successfully for oral drug development include medium-chain fatty acids such as caprylic acid (caprate) or one of its amino acid esters such as salcaprozate sodium (SNAC). The above-mentioned permeation/penetration enhancers have a surfactant-like activity where they perturb the intestinal epithelium, promoting transcellular or paracellular absorption.
