= TDD =

TDD may refer to:

== Science and technology ==
- Telecommunications device for the deaf, a device for text communication along a telephone line
- Test-driven development, a type of software development methodology
- Time-division duplex, the application of time-division multiplexing to separate outward and return signals
- LTE-TDD, a 4G telecommunications technology and standard
- Transdermal drug delivery, a method of delivering drugs through the skin and into the bloodstream

== Other uses ==
- Transportation development district, a special-purpose district created in some US states
- Teniente Jorge Henrich Arauz Airport (IATA airport code), Trinidad, Bolivia
- Tai Nüa language (ISO639-3 code: tdd)
