= C17H34O2 =

The molecular formula C_{17}H_{34}O_{2} (molar mass: 270.45 g/mol, exact mass: 270.2559 u) may refer to:

- Margaric acid, or heptadecanoic acid
- Isopropyl myristate (IPM)
