= Aristide Auguste Stanislas Verneuil =

French physician and surgeon

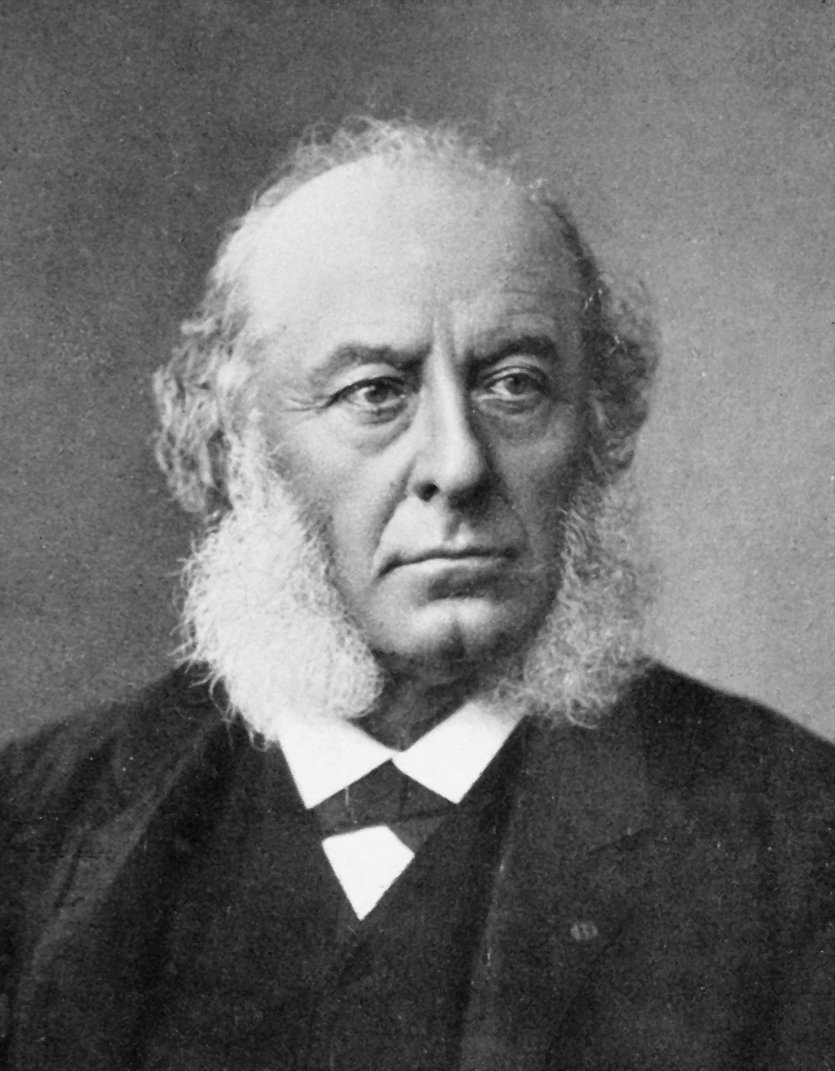
Aristide Auguste Stanislas Verneuil

Aristide Auguste Stanislas Verneuil (29 September 1823 – 11 January 1895) was a French physician and surgeon. He was born in Paris.

He studied medicine in Paris, where his instructors were Jacques Lisfranc de St. Martin (1790–1847), Pierre-Antoine-Ernest Bazin (1807–1878), Charles-Pierre Denonvilliers (1808–1872) and Joseph-François Malgaigne (1806–1865). In 1843 he became interne des hôpitaux, obtaining his doctorate in 1852 with the thesis Recherches sur la locomotion du coeur. During the following year he received his aggregation, later being associated with the Hôpital Lourcine (1862), Hôpital du Midi (1865), Hôpital Lariboisière (1865), Hôpital de la Pitié (1872), and Hôtel-Dieu de Paris (1889).

In 1868 he became a professor of external pathology, and from 1872 served as a professor of clinical surgery at the Pitié. In 1869 he became a member of the "Académie de Médecine" and president of the "Société de chirurgie". In 1887 he replaced Leon Athanese Gosselin (1815–1887) at the "Académie des Sciences".

Verneuil was known for contributions made in the development of wound dressing, and is credited for introducing forcipressure in treatment of hemorrhage. His name is associated with "Verneuil's disease", a suppurative disease affecting the apocrine sweat glands that is generally known today as hidradenitis suppurativa. Also, "plexiform neuroma" (a neoplasm consisting of twisted bundles of nerves) is sometimes referred to as "Verneuil's neuroma".

== Written works ==
He was primary author of Etudes experimentales et cliniques sur la tuberculose (Experimental and clinical studies on tuberculosis), and author of the multi-volume Mémoires de chirurgie (1877–1888), which is a collection of his medical works that includes discussions on forcipressure in hemorrhage, dry bandaging, and the use of iodoform when treating abscesses. In 1877 he was co-founder of the journal Revue mensuelle de médecine et de chirurgie.

== Honors and awards ==
Commander of the Order of Legion of Honour
