= Halimeter =

Medical diagnostic instrument

A Halimeter is an instrument for measurement of the level of volatile sulfur compounds (VSCs) in the mouth.

Halimeter was introduced in the early 1990s as an adjunct method for determining halitosis (bad breath, oral malodor) levels, alongside human assessment of odor levels (the latter is considered the gold standard). The instrument measures parts per billion levels of hydrogen sulfide and, to a lesser extent, methyl mercaptan, two gases which were previously shown to be associated with bad breath using gas chromatograph by Dr. Joseph Tonzetich in the late 1960s.

The Halimeter is manufactured by Interscan Corp. in California, and based on their earlier model 1170 portable sulfide monitor. This was the model used in the two original studies. These studies, conducted for the first time by Dr. Mel Rosenberg, showed a significant correlation between monitor levels and oral malodor scores. The small size, simplicity of use, and price (relative to gas chromatograph) of the Halimeter made it popular among dentists seeking to diagnose and treat bad breath, as well as scientific researchers. Much of the published research on bad breath over the past dozen years has employed this instrument. The electrochemical sensor is sensitive to alcohol vapors, and requires recalibration over time. The Halimeter has been the only VSC monitor for the diagnosis of halitosis for years, but now that its patent has expired, it faces competition from other sulfur monitors recently introduced into the marketplace.

More recently, the portable gas chromatograph, "OralChroma" has been recommended in the diagnosis of halitosis, as the Halimeter does not detect dimethyl sulfide, which is thought by some to be elevated in extraoral causes of halitosis. The OralChroma detects dimethyl sulfide in a semi objective manner, and hence is able to differentiate between oral malodor (intraoral halitosis) and extra-oral halitosis. The halimeter is therefore not indicated if extra-oral halitosis is suspected (its use will only be able to rule out intra-oral halitosis), but is useful for diagnosis and clinical monitoring of intra-oral halitosis.

When used correctly, this medical device can be very effective for determining the levels of certain bacteria that produce volatile sulfur compounds. The Halimeter has limitations in clinical use. For example, other common sulfides (such as mercaptans) are not as easily detected and their readings may be distorted in the test results. Certain factors can also lead to false readings from the device, in particular the consumption of certain foods. Some foods, such as garlic, onion, and spicy seasonings, can contribute to bad breath.

== See also ==
- Halitosis
- Electronic nose
- Gas chromatography
