= Microneedle =

Microneedle may refer to:

- Elements of a microneedle array/patch for transdermal drug delivery
- microneedling, a mechanical/RF skin treatment used e.g. for Collagen induction therapy
- a microinjector
