= Coluthur Gopalan =

Indian nutritionist (1918–2019)

Coluthur Gopalan FRS FRCP FMedSci
- Born: 29 November 1918; Salem, Madras Presidency, British India
- Died: 3 October 2019 (aged 100); Kilpauk, Chennai, India
- Occupation: Nutritionist

Coluthur Gopalan (29 November 1918 – 3 October 2019) was an Indian nutritionist. He was responsible for initiating nutrition research in independent India, leading to a number of interventions such as the Integrated Child Development Services, the midday meal scheme for school children, goiter prevention programme, etc. The burning feet syndrome is also known as Grierson-Gopalan syndrome. While the condition was described in 1826 by a British medical officer James Grierson, Gopalan also described this condition in 1946 when he observed it, "chiefly in females between the ages of 20 and 40 years, among the poor in South India".

== Early life and education ==
He was born in Salem, Madras Presidency, British India. His father was a police officer. At the age of ten he moved from Salem to Madras and joined Madras Christian College Higher Secondary School and later he joined the Madras Medical College and earned an M.D. from University of Madras, and Ph.D. and D.Sc. from University of London. The Bengal Famine of 1942 deeply impacted him and he turned to nutritional research.

Starting his professional career in nutrition research at the Nutrition Research Laboratory during the British period, he continued there for the next six decades. In the late 1950s, when the Nutrition Research Laboratory moved to Hyderabad and turned to the National Institute of Nutrition, Gopalan took over as director and expanded research to several key areas.

== Career ==
Gopalan's research led to a midday meal scheme for school children and a goiter prevention programme. He founded the National Nutrition Foundation, which published Nutritive Value of Indian Foods. He was a recipient of the civilian honours of the Padma Shri and the Padma Bhushan. He set up divisions for clinical research, biochemistry, bio-physics, endocrinology, analytical chemistry, food toxicology and the field units in multi-disciplinary subjects.

National Nutrition Monitoring Bureau which is product of his effort started the research to tackle problems such as protein energy malnutrition, Vitamin A deficiency, Phrynoderma, Lathyrism, fluorosis and Pellagra.

He was the director of the Indian Council of Medical Research there he expanded research into neglected communicable diseases and modernised the working of the council. Three new institutes — Malaria Research Institute; Vector Control Research Institute and Leprosy Research Institute were established to develop and implement preventive and management strategies for these diseases.

Gopalan's works on Indian foods also are commendable. He analysed over 500 Indian foods for their nutritive values and published a detailed study report of that. This work was used for calculating dietary in-take of all nutrients. This made India the first developing country to have its own recommended dietary allowances.
