= Electrochemical skin conductance =

Method of measuring skin conductance

Electrochemical skin conductance (ESC) is an objective, non-invasive and quantitative electrophysiological measure of skin conductance through the application of a pulsating direct current on the skin. It is based on reverse iontophoresis and steady chronoamperometry (more specifically chronovoltametry). ESC is intended to provide insight into and assess sudomotor (or sweat gland) function and small fiber peripheral neuropathy. The measure was principally developed by Impeto Medical to diagnose cystic fibrosis from historical research at the Mayo Clinic and then tested on other diseases with peripheral neuropathic alterations in general. It was later integrated into health connected scales by Withings. Withings's researchers, including now the inventors of the technology, released at the end of 2024 a scientific paper describing the whole technology, ranging from its origin, medical validation, and future applications.

== Biology ==
=== Anatomy: the eccrine sweat gland ===
The ESC measurement relies on the particularities of the outer-most layer of the human skin, the stratum corneum (SC), which consists of a lipid corneocyte matrix crossed by skin appendages (sweat glands and their follicles) as described in "Electrical properties of skin at moderate voltages: contribution of appendageal macropores" by Chizmadzhev and colleagues in a 1998 Biophysical Journal article. According to the authors, the stratum corneum is electrically insulated against DC voltages under 10V, and only its appendageal pathways are conductive.

In the hairless skin, such as the palms of the hands and soles of the feet, in contact with the electrodes, the eccrine sweat glands are the principal conductive pathways. This is why the ESC measurement technologies focus only on those skin parts.

These sweat glands are innervated by the sympathetic autonomic peripheral nervous system. According to Sato and colleagues in 1989, both adrenergic and cholinergic-muscarinic neurons participate, in the following physiological proportions: adrenergic, 2/7, and cholinergic, 5/7.

Particularities of the autonomic sympathetic nerve fibers that innervate sweat glands are that they are long (the postganglionic nerves start at the spinal cord and may end at the palm or sole), thin, unmyelinated or thinly myelinated C fibers. Because of these characteristics, they are prone to damage early in many neuropathic processes; assessing sweat gland nerve function, or dysfunction, therefore, can be used as a surrogate for the damage imparted to small-caliber sensory nerves in neuropathy.

=== Physiology: Stimulation of sweat function ===
During normal physiological function, activation of eccrine sweat glands starts with a chemical stimulus. For instance, in the cholinergic pathway (the dominant pathway), this leads to the following sequence, or activation cascade:

1. The neurotransmitter acetylcholine binds to its corresponding muscarinic cholinergic receptor on the membrane cells of the sweat gland wall;
2. This activates the G proteins coupled to the neuroreceptor;
3. The G proteins, or their intracellular messengers, then modulate ion channels, creating an ion flux through the membrane;
4. This polarizes the gland to voltages around 10 mV and always less than 100mV electrical potential difference between the two sides of the gland wall,

== Technology ==
=== Impeto medical: Sudoscan ===
==== Summary ====
For the purposes of measuring Electrochemical Skin Conductance Sudoscan technology activates the sweat gland with an "electrical" stimulus. The applied voltage directly polarizes the gland with voltages between 100 mV to 1000 mV. This induces ion fluxes across the gland wall, depending on the electrochemical gradient of the ions. Because the current applied is high compared to the physiological current, the test could be compared to a "stress test" for sweat glands.

In fact, firm application of the hands and feet against the electrodes blocks physiological sweating, and the active measure extracts electro-active ions (i. e., chloride near the anode, proton near the cathode) and pulls them towards the electrodes. The resulting conductance is then given for each foot and hand in μS (micro-Siemens). A comprehensive technology review, including the mathematical model underlying the concept along with its theoretical assumptions, can be found in the summary paper From Sudoscan to Bedside: Theory, Modalities, and Applications of Electrochemical Skin Conductance in Medical Diagnostics.

==== Details ====
Currently, ESC measurement can be obtained with the use of a medical device, called Sudoscan. No specific patient preparation or medical personnel training is required. The measure lasts less than 3 minutes, and is innocuous and non-invasive.

The apparatus consists of stainless-steel electrodes for the hands and the feet which are connected to a computer for recording and data management purposes. To conduct an ESC test, the patients place their hands and feet on the electrodes. Sweat glands are most numerous on the palms of the hands and soles of the feet, and thus well suited for sudomotor function evaluation.

The electrodes are used alternatively as anode or cathode. A direct current (DC) incremental voltage under 4 volts is applied on the anode. This DC, through reverse iontophoresis, induces a voltage on the cathode and generates a current (of an intensity less than 0.3 mA) between the anode and the cathode, related to electro-active ions from sweat reacting with the electrodes. The electrochemical phenomena are measured by the two active electrodes (the anode and the cathode) successively in the two active limbs (either hands or feet), whilst the two passive electrodes allow retrieval of the body potential.

During the test, 4 combinations of 15 different low DC voltages are applied. The resulting Electrochemical Skin Conductances (ESC) for each hand and foot are expressed in μS (micro-Siemens). The test also evaluates the percentage of asymmetry between the left and right side, for both hands and feet ESC, providing an assessment of whether one side is more affected than the other.

=== Withings: scales ===
==== Summary ====
Withings integrated Sudoscan technology into its scale (FDA clearance) in order to provide large adoption of the measurement and allow for at home follow-up of patients with neuropathies.

==== Details ====
The Withings technology is based on the same principle but only measure the ESC on foot from its BodyComp and BodyScan scales. A clinical trial (agreement study) demonstrated the correlation between the BodyScan scale and Sudoscan measurements. More generally the adoption of a technology going from only hospital measurements to home measurements allow the building of Real World Evidence (RWE) time series profile for patients.

=== Alternative methods and technologies ===
There are several other clinical tests available to assess sudomotor and/or small fiber function and/or peripheral or cardiac neuropathy. These may employ a measurement target other than the sweat glands, and/or alternate methodologies.

For sudomotor tests specific clinical assessments include:

- Quantitative Sudomotor Axon Reflex Testing
- Neuropad is a patch using colorimetry to measure sweat function and act as a qualitative approach by opposition to Sudoscan technology. No publications are citing this technology on pubmed since 2017.

=== Differences with Sympathetic Skin Response ===
Sympathetic Skin Response (SSR) or Galvanic Skin Response (GSR) also called Electrodermal activity (EDA) is defined as the variation in skin electrical potential resulting from sympathetic sudomotor outflow at very low levels although "The source of the skin potential is presumed to be the sweat glands and the epidermis, although it is present in subjects with congenital absence of sweat glands ... this is not a test of "sweat" function, it is often included in this category as a measure of sudomotor activity".

SSR is primarily used in psychological studies rather than for assessing sudomotor function or small nerve fibers, as its poor diagnostic power in neuropathies has demonstrated.

== Applications ==
From a physiological standpoint, the pattern of innervation of the sweat gland—namely, the postganglionic sympathetic nerve fibers—allows clinicians and researchers to use sudomotor function testing to assess dysfunction of the autonomic nervous systems (ANS).

To ensure optimal use and interpretation of the ESC, normative values were defined in adults and children. In addition, reproducibility of the method was assessed under clinical conditions, including both healthy controls and patients with common chronic conditions.

ESC has clinical utility in the evaluation and follow-up of dysautonomia and small fiber peripheral neuropathy which may occur in diseases such as:

=== Diabetes ===
==== General ====
See diabetes

Diabetes and two of its main complications: diabetic neuropathy and autonomic neuropathy. Sensorimotor polyneuropathy (DSPN) is the most common type of polyneuropathy in community-dwelling patients with diabetes, affecting about 25% of them. The course of DSPN is insidious, though, and up to 50% of patients with neuropathy may be asymptomatic, often resulting in delayed diagnosis. Advanced or painful DSPN may result not only in reduced quality of life, but has been statistically associated with retinopathy and nephropathy, and leads to considerable morbidity and mortality. The autonomic nervous system (ANS), of which sudomotor nerves are an integral part, is the primary extrinsic control mechanism regulating heart rate, blood pressure, and myocardial contractility. Cardiac autonomic neuropathy (CAN) describes a dysfunction of the ANS and its regulation of the cardiovascular system. CAN is the strongest predictor for mortality in diabetes. Because early symptoms of CAN tend to be nonspecific, its diagnosis is frequently delayed and screening for CAN should be routinely considered in diabetic patients. Assessment of sudomotor function provides a measure of sympathetic cholinergic function in the workup of CAN.

==== Diabetic foot ulcer ====
See Diabetic foot ulcer (DFU).

In diabetic wounds, issues like tissue ischemia, hypoxia, high glucose microenvironment and skin dryness disrupt the healing process, leading to delayed or nonhealing wounds and clinical complications. In some cases it led to amputations and in the worst cases to the death. In that context being able to detect earlier the diabetic neuropathies and skin dryness with electrochemical conductance to avoid complication has been proposed for DFU management.

==== Meta-analysis ====
In 2025 a meta-analysis proposed to used Electrochemical Skin conductance with an other metric, the feet skin temperature, to better anticipated diabetic peripheral neuropathies.

=== Amyloidosis ===
Amyloidosis such as familial amyloid neuropathy, AL amyloidosis, and AA amyloidosis [publication pending]. During the course of AL amyloidosis, peripheral neuropathy occurs in 10–35% of patients; dysautonomia itself is an independent prognostic factor, and assessment of sweat disturbances is routine in the evaluation of amyloidosis. ESC may provide a measure of subclinical autonomic involvement, which is not systematically assessed with more sophisticated equipment.

=== Cystic fibrosis ===
The effects of cystic fibrosis on sweat glands were described by Quinton. The performance and potential utility of ESC were assessed in this disease.

=== Parkinson's disease ===
Assessment of dysautonomia is important for patient follow-up and assessment of sudomotor function can be helpful in daily practice.

=== Chemotherapy-induced peripheral neuropathy (CIPN) ===
Chemotherapy-induced peripheral neuropathy is a common, potentially severe and dose-limiting adverse effect of multiple chemotherapeutic agents. CIPN can persist long after the completion of chemotherapy and imposes a significant quality of life and economic burden to cancer survivors. ESC allows for an objective quantification of small fiber impairment and is easy to implement in the clinic.

=== Sjögren syndrome ===
ESC may help in the diagnosis process.

=== Neuropathic pain ===
Neuropathic pain usually manifests in the setting of small fiber neuropathy. Small fiber neuropathy is common and may arise from a number of conditions such as diabetes, metabolic syndrome, infectious diseases, toxins, and autoimmune disorders. The gold standard for diagnosing small fiber neuropathy as the etiology of neuropathic pain is skin biopsy. Sudomotor assessment, an accurate objective technique, could be considered as a good screening tool to limit skin biopsy in patients in whom it is not suitable.

ESC has been evaluated for both early diagnosis of small fiber neuropathy and follow-up of treatment efficacy in each of these conditions.
