= Salcaprozate sodium =

Identifiers
- IUPAC name: sodium;8-[(2-hydroxybenzoyl)amino]octanoate
- CAS Number: 203787-91-1
- PubChem CID: 23669833
- ChemSpider: 139678
- UNII: 1YTW0422YU
- KEGG: D05787
- ChEMBL: ChEMBL2107027
- CompTox Dashboard (EPA): DTXSID50174306

Chemical and physical data
- Formula: C_{15}H_{20}NNaO_{4}
- Molar mass: 301.318 g·mol^{−1}
- 3D model (JSmol): Interactive image
- SMILES: C1=CC=C(C(=C1)C(=O)NCCCCCCCC(=O)[O-])O.[Na+]
- InChI: InChI=InChI=1S/C15H21NO4.Na/c17-13-9-6-5-8-12(13)15(20)16-11-7-3-1-2-4-10-14(18)19;/h5-6,8-9,17H,1-4,7,10-11H2,(H,16,20)(H,18,19);/q;+1/p-1; Key:UOENJXXSKABLJL-UHFFFAOYSA-M

Salcaprozate sodium (SNAC) is an intestinal permeation enhancer that is used in drug formulations particularly for macromolecules and poorly permeable compounds. SNAC has been used in formulations of drugs that have undergone clinical trials and has achieved generally recognized as safe (GRAS) status, with U.S. Food and Drug Administration approval for use in a medical food products.

An oral formulation of semaglutide that includes SNAC has been approved for human use in the United States and Europe.
