= Dentyl pH =

Brand of mouthwash

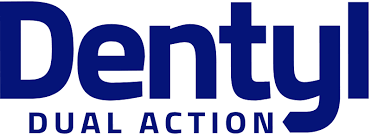
Logo

Dentyl Dual Action, previously known as Dentyl Active, and originally as Dentyl pH, is a brand of mouthwash, an oral hygiene product designed to reduce the presence of bacteria responsible for tooth decay, gingivitis and halitosis. Traditional mouthwash formulations typically use alcohol or other antimicrobial ingredients to kill bacteria.

Dentyl contains the powerful antimicrobial agent cetylpyridinium chloride (CPC), which disrupts the membrane – the fatty outer layer – of the bacteria. However, it is atypical in that it also contains isopropyl myristate, an oily, non-aqueous, component that adheres to bacteria making them easier to rinse from the mouth. The mouthwash consists of two solutions – an oil phase and a water phase – which remain separate in the bottle until shaken. Once shaken, the two liquids mix together and activate to create a formulation that physically lifts and removes plaque, bacteria and food debris. Dentyl is unique in that what has been removed from the mouth can be seen in the sink.

== History ==
The use of oil in a mouthwash product was developed by Mel Rosenberg, following his study of bacteria that break down oil spills. Dentyl pH was first launched in the UK in 1996, through Fresh Breath Limited, as part of a patients' programme that aimed to prevent or treat bad breath, plaque and gum disease.

In 2007, Dentyl pH released Icy-Fresh Mint and Icy-Fresh Cherry flavours to be sold alongside the original Smooth Mint flavoured mouthwash. In July 2007, the brand was bought by Blistex Inc. Over time new variants and flavours have been introduced, however three core products remain: Smooth Mint, Fresh Clove and Icy Cherry. In the UK, in April 2009, Dentyl was recalled due to a 'microbiological problem' by its UK manufacturer McBride. This led to the product being withdrawn from McBride and the contract being given to Boots Contract Manufacturing at their facility in Nottingham. In 2014 Dentyl was acquired by DDD Ltd in the UK.

== Recent History ==
In 2018, Dentyl was acquired by Venture Life Group and added to their existing portfolio of oral care products, which includes the UltraDEX brand. Under Venture Life's ownership, the brand has been revitalised, with significant investment in marketing support and a focus on continued growth in distribution in the UK and worldwide. Dentyl is sold many countries around the world, including China, Australia, France, United Kingdom, South Africa and Finland.
