= Burning feet syndrome =

- Specialty: Endocrinology

Burning feet syndrome, also known as Grierson–Gopalan syndrome, is a medical condition that causes severe burning and aching of the feet, hyperesthesia, and vasomotor changes of the feet that lead to excessive sweating. It can even affect the eyes, causing scotoma and amblyopia. The condition occurs more frequently in women, and usually manifests itself when a person is between twenty and forty years old.

== Presentation ==
The burning heat is usually limited to the soles of the feet, but may extend up to the ankles or lower legs of some patients. The burning can sometimes be accompanied by feelings of 'pins and needles' or tingling in these regions. Nighttime is when almost all people with this syndrome report the heat symptoms being the worst, with the condition getting better as morning comes. Those who have psychosomatic disorders sometimes display psychological symptoms along with the burning of feet associated with the syndrome. For most, there is no redness of the skin of their feet during the heat sensations, and almost never is there accompanying tenderness along with it.

== Causes ==
Burning feet syndrome can be inherited, or it can be caused by pressure being put on the nerves. Links also exist between this syndrome and diseases such as hypothyroidism, diabetes mellitus, and rheumatoid arthritis; links are also believed to exist between this syndrome and zinc deficiency. It is also linked to vitamin B (specifically pantothenic acid) deficiencies and kidney failure. It is suspected to be related to or a small fiber neuropathy.

== Diagnosis ==
Diagnosis is mainly clinical. Symptoms are burning sensation in soles, sometime ankles and legs in many patients. Tingling sensation and pin prick sensations are also common. Sweating of legs and soles is seen. In some case hypertrophy of one of the legs is seen mainly in tropical region where external temperature is also higher.

== Eponym ==
The condition is termed Grierson–Gopalan syndrome after Coluthur Gopalan and J. Grierson.

== See also ==
- Erythromelalgia
- Small fiber peripheral neuropathy
- Tarsal tunnel syndrome
- Chemotherapy-induced acral erythema
