= Small fiber neuropathy =

Disorders of nerves outside the brain and spinal cord

Small fiber peripheral neuropathy
- Specialty: Neurology, pain medicine

Small fiber peripheral neuropathy is a type of peripheral neuropathy that results from damage to the small unmyelinated and myelinated peripheral nerve fibers. These fibers, categorized as C fibers and small Aδ fibers, are present throughout human skin, peripheral nerves, and organs. Small fiber nerves receive somatic afferent signals (somatic afferents) and regulate components of the autonomic nervous system (autonomic efferents). It is estimated that 15–20 million people in the United States have some form of peripheral neuropathy.

== Signs and symptoms ==
Small fiber neuropathy is a condition characterized by severe pain. Symptoms typically begin in the feet or hands but can start in other parts of the body. Some people initially experience a more generalized, whole-body pain. The pain is often described as stabbing or burning, or abnormal skin sensations such as tingling or itchiness. In some individuals, the pain is more severe during times of rest or at night. The signs and symptoms of small fiber neuropathy can occur at any point in life depending on the underlying cause.

Individuals with small fiber neuropathy often cannot feel pain that is concentrated in a very small area, such as the prick of a pin. However, they have an increased sensitivity to pain in general (hyperalgesia) and experience pain from stimulation that typically does not cause pain (allodynia). People affected with this condition may also have a reduced ability to differentiate between hot and cold.

Sudomotor dysfunction is one of the most common and earliest neurophysiological manifestations of small fiber neuropathies.

In some instances, the small fibers of the autonomic nervous system can be affected, leading to urinary or bowel problems, episodes of rapid heartbeat (palpitations), dry eyes or mouth, or abnormal sweating. They can also experience a sharp drop in blood pressure upon standing (orthostatic hypotension), which can cause dizziness, blurred vision, or fainting.

Small fiber neuropathy is considered a form of peripheral neuropathy because it affects the peripheral nervous system, which connects the brain and spinal cord to muscles and to cells that detect sensations such as touch, smell, and pain. Insensitivity to pain can be particularly problematic. One may be bleeding or have a skin injury without even knowing it.

=== Topographic pattern ===
Like many polyneuropathies, the symptoms are typically length-dependent, starting in the longer nerves and progressively attacking shorter nerves. This means that symptoms often start in the hands and feet before progressing upwards, and that symptoms are usually more severe in the extremities. Some patients have a widespread, non-length dependent, or "patchy", presentation which is sporadic and can affect many nerves.

Patients with Fabry disease have isolated small fiber engagement, and can have a more widespread small fiber disruption.

== Causes ==
Mutations in the SCN9A or SCN10A genes can cause small fiber neuropathy. These genes provide instructions for making pieces (the alpha subunits) of sodium channels. The SCN9A gene instructs the production of the alpha subunit for the NaV1.7 sodium channel, and the SCN10A gene instructs the production of the alpha subunit for the NaV1.8 sodium channel. Sodium channels transport positively charged sodium ions into cells and play a key role in a cell's ability to generate and transmit electrical signals. The NaV1.7 and NaV1.8 sodium channels are found in nerve cells called nociceptors, which transmit pain signals to the spinal cord and brain.

Mutations in the SCN9A gene, which cause small fiber neuropathy, result in NaV1.7 sodium channels that do not fully close when the channel is turned off. Many SCN10A gene mutations result in NaV1.8 sodium channels that open more easily than usual. The altered channels allow sodium ions to flow abnormally into nociceptors. This increase in sodium ions enhances the transmission of pain signals, making individuals more sensitive to stimulation that might otherwise not cause pain (allodynia).

In this condition, the small fibers that extend from the nociceptors through which pain signals are transmitted degenerate over time. The cause of this degeneration is unknown, but it likely accounts for some of the disorder's signs and symptoms, such as loss of temperature discrimination and pinprick sensation. The combination of increased pain signaling and degeneration of pain-transmitting fibers leads to a variable condition with signs and symptoms that can fluctuate over time.

SCN9A gene mutations have been found in approximately 30 percent of individuals with small fiber neuropathy; SCN10A gene mutations are responsible for about 5 percent of cases. In some instances, other health conditions cause this disorder. Diabetes mellitus and impaired glucose tolerance are the most common diseases that lead to this disorder, with 6 to 50 percent of diabetics or pre-diabetics developing small fiber neuropathy. Other causes of this condition include Fabry disease; immune disorders such as celiac disease or Sjögren's disease; an inflammatory condition called sarcoidosis; and human immunodeficiency virus (HIV) infection.

In people with diabetes who rapidly reduce their HbA1c value by over three percentage points within a short time frame (3–6 months), a temporary form of small fiber neuropathy often results.

Since 2013, studies have suggested an association between autonomic small fiber neuropathy and postural orthostatic tachycardia syndrome. Studies have also linked small fiber neuropathy to erythromelalgia, fibromyalgia, Ehlers–Danlos syndrome, and long COVID.

== Diagnosis ==
The diagnosis of small fiber neuropathy often requires ancillary testing. Nerve conduction studies and electromyography are commonly used to evaluate large myelinated sensory and motor nerve fibers, but are ineffective in diagnosing small fiber neuropathies.

Quantitative sensory testing (QST) assesses small fiber function by measuring temperature and vibratory sensation. Abnormal QST results can be attributed to dysfunction in the central nervous system. Furthermore, QST is limited by a patient's subjective experience of pain sensation. Electrochemical skin conductance and quantitative sudomotor axon reflex testing (QSART) measures sweating response at local body sites to evaluate the small nerve fibers that innervate sweat glands.

Electrochemical skin conductance has been evaluated for both early diagnosis of small fiber neuropathy and follow-up of treatment efficacy.

=== Skin biopsy ===
A skin biopsy for the measurement of epidermal nerve fiber density is an increasingly common technique for the diagnosis of small fiber peripheral neuropathy. Physicians can biopsy the skin with a 3-mm circular punch tool and immediately fix the specimen in 2% paraformaldehyde lysine-periodate or Zamboni's fixative. Specimens are sent to a specialized laboratory for processing and analysis where the small nerve fibers are quantified by a neuropathologist to obtain a diagnostic result.

This skin punch biopsy measurement technique is called intraepidermal nerve fiber density (IENFD). The following table describes the IENFD values in males and females of a 3 mm biopsy 10 cm above the lateral malleolus (above ankle outer side of leg). Any value measured below the 0.05 Quantile IENFD values per age span, is considered a reliable positive diagnosis for small fiber peripheral neuropathy.

Intraepidermal nerve fiber density (IENFD) normative values for clinical use
	Females		Males	
Age in years	0.05 Quantile IENFD values per age span	Median IENFD values per age span	0.05 Quantile IENFD values per age span	Median IENFD values per age span
20–29	8.4	13.5	6.1	10.9
30–39	7.1	12.4	5.2	10.3
40–49	5.7	11.2	4.4	9.6
50–59	4.3	9.8	3.5	8.9
60–69	3.2	8.7	2.8	8.3
70–79	2.2	7.6	2.1	7.7
≥80	1.6	6.7	1.7	7.2

== Treatment ==
Treatment is based on the underlying cause, if any. Where the likely underlying condition is known, treatment of this condition is indicated to reduce progression of the disease and symptoms. For cases without those conditions, there is only symptomatic treatment.

== Epidemiology ==
The estimated prevalence of small fiber neuropathy is 52.95 per 100,000. The incidence it thought to be 11.73 per 100,000. This represents an estimated minimum incidence and prevalence as small fiber neuropathies are generally under diagnosed.

== Comorbidities ==
A 2018 study (n=921) found no associated condition in 53% of the patients. In the remaining patients conditions more prevalent than reported literature findings were autoimmune diseases, sodium channel gene mutations, diabetes mellitus including glucose intolerance, and vitamin B12 deficiencies.

== See also ==
- Neuropathy
- Polyneuropathy
- Wartenberg's migratory sensory neuropathy
- Burning feet syndrome
- Electrochemical skin conductance
