= Electrodermal activity =

Variation in electrical response of the skin

A sample GSR signal of 60 seconds duration

Electrodermal activity (EDA) is the property of the human body that causes continuous variation in the electrical characteristics of the skin. Historically, EDA has also been known as skin conductance, galvanic skin response (GSR), electrodermal response (EDR), psychogalvanic reflex (PGR), skin conductance response (SCR), sympathetic skin response (SSR) and skin conductance level (SCL). The long history of research into the active and passive electrical properties of the skin by a variety of disciplines has resulted in an excess of names, now standardized to electrodermal activity (EDA).

The traditional theory of EDA holds that skin resistance varies with the state of sweat glands in the skin. Sweating is controlled by the sympathetic nervous system, and skin conductance is an indication of psychological or physiological arousal. If the sympathetic branch of the autonomic nervous system is highly aroused, then sweat glands activity also increases, which in turn increases skin conductivity. In this way, skin conductivity can be a measure of emotional and sympathetic responses. But the theory associating sweat and EDA was already debated decades ago since individuals without sweat glands have an EDA signal : ""The source of the skin potential is presumed to be the sweat glands and the epidermis, although it is present in subjects with congenital absence of sweat glands ... this is not a test of “sweat” function, it is often included in this category as a measure of sudomotor activity".". This debate is ongoing since more recent technology, such as Electrochemical skin conductance (ESC), demonstrated a real measure of sweat conductivity with several medical applications. A good way to differentiate both is to look at measures values and type:

- EDA is a continuous measurement (signal curve with time) given in μS (microsiemens) with value mostly <5
- while ESC values ranges from 0 to 100 μS with values under 10 being extremely low and rare. A value of 0 in the case of ESC could be theorically a single point EDA when sweat is totally absent.

More research is needed and inclusion of additional phenomena (resistance, potential, impedance, Electrochemical skin conductance, and admittance, sometimes responsive and sometimes apparently spontaneous) suggest that EDA is more complex than it seems. There is a knowledge limitation, as wearable brands have included an EDA measure as a feature : "This aspect leads to the conclusion that the reliability of consumer wearables must be further investigated, especially by combining raw data collection with specific preprocessing techniques".

== History ==
In 1849, Dubois-Reymond in Germany first observed that human skin was electrically active. He immersed the limbs of his subjects in a zinc sulfate solution and found that electric current flowed between a limb with muscles contracted and one that was relaxed. He therefore attributed his EDA observations to muscular phenomena. Thirty years later, in 1878 in Switzerland, Hermann and Luchsinger demonstrated a connection between EDA and sweat glands. Hermann later demonstrated that the electrical effect was strongest in the palms of the hands, suggesting that sweat was an important factor.

Vigouroux (France, 1879), working with emotionally distressed patients, was the first researcher to relate EDA to psychological activity. In 1888, the French neurologist Féré demonstrated that skin resistance activity could be changed by emotional stimulation and that activity could be inhibited by drugs.

In 1889 in Russia, Ivane Tarkhnishvili observed variations in skin electrical potentials in the absence of any external stimuli, and he developed a meter to observe the variations as they happened in real time.

The scientific study of EDA began in the early 1900s. One of the first references to the use of EDA instruments in psychoanalysis is the book by C. G. Jung entitled Studies in Word Analysis, published in 1906. Jung and his colleagues used the meter to evaluate the emotional sensitivities of patients to lists of words during word association. Jung was so impressed with EDA monitoring, he allegedly cried, "Aha, a looking glass into the unconscious!" Jung described his use of the device in counseling in his book, Studies in Word Association, and such use has continued with various practitioners.

The controversial Austrian psychoanalyst Wilhelm Reich also studied EDA in his experiments at the Psychological Institute at the University of Oslo, in 1935 and 1936, to confirm the existence of a bio-electrical charge behind his concept of vegetative, pleasurable "streamings".

By 1972, more than 1500 articles on electrodermal activity had been published in professional publications, and today EDA is regarded as the most popular method for investigating human psychophysiological phenomena. As of 2013, EDA monitoring was still on the increase in clinical applications.

== Description ==
Skin conductance is not under conscious control. Instead, it is modulated autonomously by sympathetic activity which drives human behavior, cognitive and emotional states on a subconscious level. Skin conductance, therefore, offers direct insights into autonomous emotional regulation.

Human extremities, including fingers, palms, and soles of feet display different bio-electrical phenomena. They can be detected with an EDA meter, a device that displays the change in electrical conductance between two points over time. The two current paths are along the surface of the skin and through the body. Active measuring involves sending a small amount of current through the body.

Some studies include the human skin's response to alternating current, including recently deceased bodies.

=== Physiological basis ===
There is a relationship between emotional arousal and sympathetic activity, although the electrical change alone does not identify which specific emotion is being elicited. These autonomic sympathetic changes alter sweat and blood flow, which in turn affects GSR and GSP (Galvanic skin potential). The amount of sweat glands varies across the human body, being highest in hand and foot regions (200–600 sweat glands per cm^{2}). The response of the skin and muscle tissue to external and internal stimuli can cause the conductance to vary by several microsiemens. A correctly calibrated device can record and display the subtle changes.

The combined changes between electrodermal resistance and electrodermal potential make up electrodermal activity. Galvanic skin resistance (GSR) is an older term that refers to the recorded electrical resistance between two electrodes when a very weak current is steadily passed between them. The electrodes are normally placed about an inch apart, and the resistance recorded varies according to the emotional state of the subject. Galvanic skin potential (GSP) refers to the voltage measured between two electrodes without any externally applied current. It is measured by connecting the electrodes to a voltage amplifier. This voltage also varies with the emotional state of the subject.

==== Examples ====
A painful stimulus such as a pinprick elicits a sympathetic response by the sweat glands, increasing secretion. Although this increase is generally very small, sweat contains water and electrolytes, which increase electrical conductivity, thus lowering the electrical resistance of the skin. These changes in turn affect GSR. Another common manifestation is the vasodilation (dilation) of blood vessels in the face, referred to as blushing, as well as increased sweating that occurs when one is embarrassed.

EDA is highly responsive to emotions in some people. Fear, anger, startled response, orienting response, and sexual feelings are among the reactions that may be reflected in EDA. These responses are utilized as part of the polygraph or lie detector test.

EDA in regular subjects differs according to feelings of being treated fairly or unfairly, but psychopaths have been shown to manifest no such differences. This indicates that the EDA record of a polygraph may be deceptive in a criminal investigation.

=== Different units of EDA ===
EDA reflects both slow varying tonic sympathetic activity and fast varying phasic sympathetic activity. Tonic activity can be expressed in units of electrodermal level (EDL or SCL), while phasic activity is expressed in units of electrodermal responses (EDR or SCR).

Phasic changes (EDR) are short-lasting changes in EDA that appear as a response to a distinct stimulus. Tonic activity (EDL) is the slow-moving baseline level of EDA that varies over tens of seconds to minutes, independent of any distinct stimulus. EDRs can also appear spontaneously without an observable external stimulus. These types of EDRs are referred to as "nonspecific EDR" (NS.EDR). The phasic EDR is useful when investigating multifaceted attentional processes.

Although the frequency of nonspecific EDRs within a defined time period (e.g. 30–60 seconds) can be used as one index of tonic EDA, the tonic and phasic components reflect physiologically distinct processes rather than different views of a single signal. Functional neuroimaging indicates that tonic skin conductance level and phasic skin conductance responses are associated with dissociable neural systems: tonic SCL covaries with activity in the ventromedial prefrontal and orbitofrontal cortices, whereas the rate of change in electrodermal activity reflecting phasic SCRs is associated with a more distributed network including the anterior cingulate, insula, thalamus and lateral prefrontal cortex. Tonic EDA is considered useful in investigations of general arousal and alertness.

Because the two components operate on different timescales, with tonic SCL changing gradually over tens of seconds to minutes, and phasic SCRs appearing as brief responses lasting only a few seconds, they index different aspects of sympathetic activity and are typically analysed separately. A range of decomposition methods have been developed to separate the continuous signal into its tonic and phasic components, allowing each to be quantified independently.

== Uses ==
EDA is a common measure of autonomic nervous system activity, with a long history of being used in psychological research. Hugo D. Critchley, Chair of Psychiatry at the Brighton and Sussex Medical School states, "EDA is a sensitive psychophysiological index of changes in autonomic sympathetic arousal that are integrated with emotional and cognitive states." Many biofeedback therapy devices utilize EDA as an indicator of the user's stress response with the goal of helping the user to control anxiety. EDA is used to assess an individual's neurological status without using traditional, but uncomfortable and expensive, EEG-based monitoring. It has also been used as a proxy of psychological stress.

EDA has also been studied as a method of pain assessment in premature born infants.

Often, EDA monitoring is combined with the recording of heart rate, respiratory rate, and blood pressure, because they are all autonomically dependent variables. EDA measurement is one component of modern polygraph devices, which are often used as lie detectors.

== Possible problems ==
External factors such as temperature and humidity affect EDA measurements, which can lead to inconsistent results. Internal factors such as medications and hydration can also change EDA measurements, demonstrating inconsistency with the same stimulus level. Also, the classic understanding has treated EDA as if it represented one homogeneous change in arousal across the body, but in fact different locations of its measurement can lead to different responses; for example, the responses on the left and right wrists are driven by different regions of the brain, providing multiple sources of arousal; thus, the EDA measured in different places on the body varies not only with different sweat gland density but also with different underlying sources of arousal. Lastly, electrodermal responses are delayed 1–3 seconds. These show the complexity of determining the relationship between EDA and sympathetic activity. The skill of the operator may be a significant factor in the successful application of the tool.

== See also ==
- Affective computing
- Biosignal
- Electroacupuncture
- E-meter
