= Mel Rosenberg =

Canadian microbiologist

- מל רוזנברג
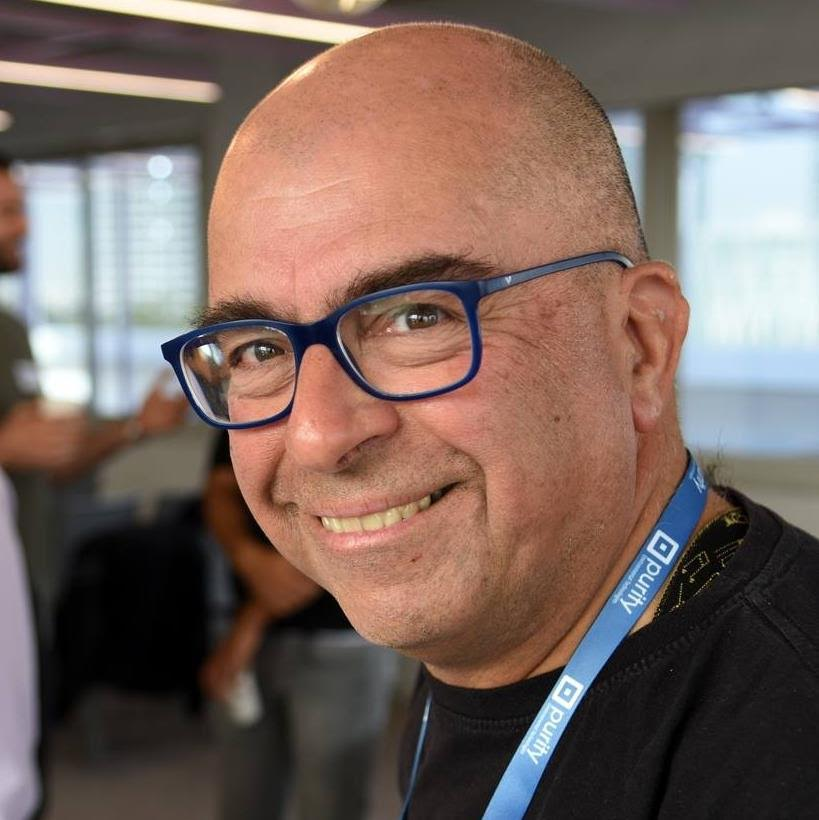
- Born: November 12, 1951 (age 74); Winnipeg, ManitobaCanada
- Education: B.Sc., Hebrew University of Jerusalem; M.Sc., Tel Aviv University; Ph.D., Tel Aviv University
- Occupation: Microbiologist
- Employer: Tel Aviv University
- Title: Professor
- Spouse: Shulamit Sapir-Nevo
- Children: 2
- Website: english.tau.ac.il/profile/melros/

Mel Rosenberg (Hebrew: מל רוזנברג; born Melvyn Rosenberg, 12 November 1951 in Winnipeg, Manitoba) is a Canadian-born Israeli microbiologist, inventor, author and educator. He is known for his research on halitosis and microbial adhesion, and for co-developing a two-phase mouthwash technology later commercialized as Dentyl pH. Rosenberg has published extensively in scientific journals and holds several patents related to oral health. In addition to his scientific career, he co-founded Ourboox, a digital platform for creating and sharing picture books online. He is also a children's book author and podcast host.

== Early life and education ==
Mel Rosenberg was born in Winnipeg, Manitoba, Canada, in 1951. He grew up in Ottawa and immigrated to Israel in 1969. He earned a B.Sc. in chemistry from the Hebrew University of Jerusalem in 1973, and an M.Sc. in microbiology from Tel Aviv University in 1975. In 1982, he completed a Ph.D. in microbiology at Tel Aviv University. His doctoral research focused on the surface properties of bacteria and their role in microbial adhesion.

== Academic and scientific career ==
Following the completion of his Ph.D., Rosenberg joined the Department of Human Microbiology at the Sackler Faculty of Medicine, Tel Aviv University, where he later became a full professor. His research focused on microbial adhesion, bacterial surface properties, and the diagnosis and treatment of halitosis. He authored or co-authored over 100 scientific publications and book chapters in these areas.

Rosenberg co-developed a two-phase oil–water mouthwash technology designed to reduce oral malodor by targeting volatile sulfur compounds. The formulation was later commercialized as Dentyl pH and marketed internationally. He also co-developed the Halimeter, a device used for measuring oral malodor.

Together with Anton Amann, he co-founded the Journal of Breath Research and served as its first co-editor-in-chief. He has also contributed to public science education through lectures, media appearances, and online videos. His TED-Ed lessons on bad breath, body odor, and dental caries have reached wide audiences.

== Writing and Publishing ==
In addition to his scientific career, Rosenberg is a writer and children's book author. He has written numerous digital books, many of which are available on Ourboox, a platform he co-founded in 2014 to enable writers, illustrators, and educators to create and share picture books online. The platform now hosts over 300,000 books in multiple languages.

Rosenberg's debut picture book in the United States, Emily Saw a Door, is scheduled for publication by Penguin Random House in February 2026. It is the English-language version of the book (Hebrew: אמילי ראתה דלת), which was first published by Tal-May in Israel in 2023. He is also active in promoting children's literature through interviews and podcasts, including the "Children's Literature" channel on the New Books Network, where he interviews authors and illustrators from around the world.

== Personal life ==
Rosenberg lives near Tel Aviv with his wife, Shuli (Shulamit Sapir-Nevo), and has two children. He is an accomplished jazz musician – saxophone and vocals – and has put out a number of mainstream jazz albums. He appeared in a small role in the film JeruZalem in 2015.

== Selected publications ==
- Shuster, A; Korem, M; Jacob-Hirsch, J; Amariglio, N; Rechavi, G; Rosenberg, M (2011). "Microbial alcohol-conferred hemolysis is a late response to alcohol stress". FEMS Yeast Res. 11 (4): 315–23. doi:10.1111/j.1567-1364.2011.00722.x. PMID 21276200.
- Korem, M; Gov, Y; Rosenberg, M (2010). "Global gene expression in Staphylococcus aureus following exposure to alcohol". Microb Pathog. 48 (2): 74–84. doi:10.1016/j.micpath.2009.11.002. PMID 19900530.
- Shirron, N; Korem, M; Shuster, A; Leikin-Frankel, A; Rosenberg, M (2008). "Effect of Alcohol on Bacterial Hemolysis". Curr. Microbiol. 57 (4): 318–25. doi:10.1007/s00284-008-9196-7. PMID 18661181. S2CID 19231034.
- Rosenberg, M (2002). "The science of bad breath". Scientific American. 286 (4): 72–9. Bibcode:2002SciAm.286d..72R. doi:10.1038/scientificamerican0402-72. PMID 11905111. presenting a circumferential overview of Halitosis.
- Tal, H; Rosenberg, M (1990). "Estimation of dental plaque levels and gingival inflammation using a simple oral rinse technique". J. Periodontol. 61 (6): 339–42. doi:10.1902/jop.1990.61.6.339. PMID 2366142. which shows the effect of mouth rinsing on the oral bacteria.
- Goldberg, S; Konis, Y; Rosenberg, M (1990). "Effect of Cetylpyridinium Chloride on Microbial Adhesion to Hexadecane and Polystyrene". Appl Environ Microbiol. 56 (6): 1678–82. Bibcode:1990ApEnM..56.1678G. doi:10.1128/AEM.56.6.1678-1682.1990. PMC 184492. PMID 16348211. This article shows how hydrophobicity of CPC affects oral bacteria, as the research basis for the invention of a two-phase mouthwash.
- Rosenberg, M; Septon, I; Eli, I; Bar-Ness, R; Gelernter, I; Brenner, S; Gabbay, J (1991). "Halitosis measurement by an industrial sulphide monitor". J. Periodontol. 62 (8): 487–9. doi:10.1902/jop.1991.62.8.487. PMID 1920015. which was the basis for the commercial use of sulphide monitors such as the Halimeter to measure halitosis.
- Bosy, A; Kulkarni, GV; Rosenberg, M; McCulloch, CAG (1994). "Relationship of oral malodor to periodontitis: evidence of independence in discrete subpopulations". J. Periodontol. 65 (1): 37–46. doi:10.1902/jop.1994.65.1.37. PMID 8133414. S2CID 6646915. starting an academic debate on the role of periodontitis in halitosis.
- Kozlovsky, A; Gordon, D; Gelernter, I; Rosenberg, M; Rosenberg, M (1994). "Correlation between the BANA test and oral malodor parameters" (PDF). J Dent Res. 73 (5): 1036–42. doi:10.1177/00220345940730050401. hdl:2027.42/66772. PMID 8006229. S2CID 11435697. another article which shows the relation between a periodontal test to malodor parameters.
- Rosenberg, M; Kozlovsky, A; Gelernter, I; Cherniak, O; Gabbay, J; Baht, R; Eli, I (1995). "Self-estimation of oral malodor". J Dent Res. 74 (9): 1577–82. doi:10.1177/00220345950740091201. PMID 7560419. S2CID 34355485. laying an important grounds to research of the psychopathological aspects of halitosis.
- Sterer, N.; Rosenberg, M. (2020). Breath Odors. Springer. pp. 1–104. doi:10.1007/978-3-030-44731-1. ISBN 978-3-030-44730-4. S2CID 68647679.
