= Ourboox =

Online platform for creating and sharing ebooks

Ourboox is a free online platform for creating and sharing ebooks that incorporate text, images, videos, puzzles, maps and quizzes.

The Ourboox platform enables users to add text in any language that is compatible with html5, to add artwork in JPEG, PNG, or GIF formats, and to embed various media content from other websites, e.g. YouTube, Vimeo, SoundCloud and others.

Each e-book is identified by its own URL, and can be edited by the author even after it is published. The content on Ourboox is not protected by digital rights management (DRM), and can thus be readily indexed and searched by various search engines.

A feature of Ourboox is the use of a page-flipping script, which emulates printed books. This feature is suited for either direction of reading – right-to-left and left-to-right.

Ourboox has gained popularly among teachers and students, and currently has over 16000 books in 24 languages and 94 genres as of February 2017. It was established by Mel Rosenberg and Ran Shternin, and was launched in 2014.
