= Dermatology Life Quality Index =

Medical questionnaire

The Dermatology life Quality Index (DLQI) is a ten-question questionnaire used to measure the impact of skin disease on the quality of life of an affected person. It is designed for people aged 16 years and above.

== History ==
The DLQI was created by Andrew Y Finlay and Gul Karim Khan from 1990 to 1994 at the Department of Dermatology, University of Wales College of Medicine (now Cardiff University), Cardiff, UK. 120 patients with a variety of skin diseases completed a questionnaire that asked them to write down all of the ways that their skin disease affected their lives. 49 different ways were identified, and these were used as the basis of the questions of the DLQI.

The DLQI was first presented at the British Association of Dermatologists annual meeting in July 1993 and described in an article published in 1994 in Clinical and Experimental Dermatology. This article has become one of the most frequently cited articles in clinical dermatology. The DLQI is the most frequently used method for evaluating quality of life for patients with different skin conditions.

== Questionnaire description ==
There are 10 questions, covering the following topics: symptoms, embarrassment, shopping and home care, clothes, social and leisure, sport, work or study, close relationships, sex, treatment. Each question refers to the impact of the skin disease on the patient’s life over the previous week.

== Language availability ==
The DLQI has been translated into over 140 languages. The full translations are available at the Cardiff University Department of Dermatology website.

== Scoring ==
Each question is scored from 0 to 3, giving a possible score range from 0 (meaning no impact of skin disease on quality of life) to 30 (meaning maximum impact on quality of life).

== Meaning of DLQI scores ==
A series of validated “band descriptors” were described in 2005 to give meaning to the scores of the DLQI.

These bands are as follows: 0-1 = No effect on patient’s life, 2-5 = Small effect, 6-10 = Moderate effect, 11-20 = Very large effect, 21-30 = Extremely large effect.

The Minimal Clinically Important Difference (MCID) is the score difference that is the minimum meaningful difference for a patient. Although previously considered to be 5, the DLQI MCID for inflammatory skin diseases should be considered to be a score difference of 4.

== Conversion to EQ-5D scores ==
DLQI scores can be converted to EQ-5D utility values.

== Uses of DLQI ==
=== Clinical practice ===
The DLQI can provide clinicians with more accurate insight into the impairment of quality of life experienced by individual patients. This may lead to more appropriate clinical decisions. The DLQI can also be used when required by national guidelines, for example in the management of psoriasis or hand eczema.

=== Guidelines ===
The DLQI is recommended for use in national treatment guidelines, and to assist management decisions, in many countries, including: Australia, Canada, Bulgaria, Croatia, Czech Republic, England and Wales, Europe, Germany, Hungary, Italy, Japan, Norway, Poland, Romania, Saudi Arabia, Scotland, Singapore, South Africa, Spain, Sweden, Switzerland, Taiwan, Turkey and Venezuela.

=== Research ===
The DLQI has been used as a patient reported outcome measure in many published clinical research studies. For example, it has been used to assess novel drugs, models of clinical care, in audit of clinical services and in assessment of teledermatology. The DLQI is the most widely used quality of life outcome measure in randomised controlled trials of therapies for psoriasis.

=== Rule of Tens ===
The Rule of Tens is a concept to aid clinicians in making the diagnosis of “severe psoriasis”. It states that a patient is considered to have “severe psoriasis” if their body surface area affected is >10%, or if their Psoriasis Area and Severity Index (PASI) score is >10, or if the DLQI score is >10. The Rule of Tens has influenced national guidelines concerning the criteria to be fulfilled before starting a patient on biological therapy.

=== Copyright ===
The DLQI is copyrighted but the originators allow it to be used for routine clinical purposes without seeking permission and without charge.

=== E-delivery ===
The DLQI has been validated for use on tablets such as the iPad.

=== Systematic reviews of DLQI usage ===
Several systematic reviews have been carried out documenting the use of the DLQI.

The DLQI has been used as an outcome measure in 454 randomised controlled trials, involving 69 diseases and 43 countries. In 24 randomised control trials the DLQI was used as a primary outcome measure. The DLQI has been used as a benchmark in the validation of 101 quality of life instruments.

A systematic review of 207 studies has described aspects of the validation of the DLQI. The 207 articles included 58,828 patients from >49 different countries and 41 diseases met the inclusion criteria. The DLQI demonstrated strong test–retest reliability; 43 studies confirmed good internal consistency, Twelve studies used anchors to assess change responsiveness with effect sizes from small to large, giving confidence that the DLQI responds appropriately to change. Forty-two studies tested known-groups validity, providing confidence in construct and use of the DLQI over many parameters, including disease severity, anxiety, depression, stigma, scarring, well-being, sexual function, disease location and duration.
