= Iontophoresis =

Drug delivery through the skin using electricity

- ICD-9-CM: 99.27
- MedlinePlus: 007293

Iontophoresis is a process of transdermal drug delivery by use of a voltage gradient on the skin. Molecules are transported across the stratum corneum by electrophoresis and electroosmosis and the electric field can also increase the permeability of the skin. These phenomena, directly and indirectly, constitute active transport of matter due to an applied electric current. The transport is measured in units of chemical flux, commonly μmol/(cm^{2}×hour). Iontophoresis has experimental, therapeutic and diagnostic applications.

== Uses ==
=== Laboratory uses ===
Iontophoresis is useful in laboratory experiments, especially in neuropharmacology. Transmitter molecules naturally pass signals between neurons. By microelectrophoretic techniques, including microiontophoresis, neurotransmitters and other chemical agents can be artificially administered very near living and naturally functioning neurons, the activity of which can be simultaneously recorded. This is used to elucidate their pharmacological properties and natural roles.

=== Therapeutic uses ===
Therapeutically, electromotive drug administration (EMDA) delivers a medicine or other chemical through the skin. In a manner of speaking, it is an injection without a needle, and may be described as non-invasive. It is different from dermal patches, which do not rely on an electric field. It drives a charged substance, usually a medication or bioactive agent, transdermally by repulsive electromotive force, through the skin. A small electric current is applied to an iontophoretic chamber placed on the skin, containing a charged active agent and its solvent vehicle. Another chamber or a skin electrode carries the return current. One or two chambers are filled with a solution containing an active ingredient and its solvent vehicle. The positively charged chamber, called the anode, will repel a positively charged chemical species, whereas the negatively charged chamber, called the cathode, will repel a negatively charged species into the skin.

It is used to treat some types of palmar-plantar hyperhidrosis. In the treatment of hyperhidrosis, tap water is often the chosen solution for mild and medium forms. In very serious cases of hyperhidrosis, a solution containing glycopyrronium bromide or glycopyrrolate, a cholinergic inhibitor, can be used.

=== Diagnostic uses ===
Iontophoresis of acetylcholine is used in research as a way to test the health of the endothelium by stimulating endothelium-dependent generation of nitric oxide and subsequent microvascular vasodilation. Acetylcholine is positively charged and is therefore placed in the anode chamber.

Pilocarpine iontophoresis is often used to stimulate sweat secretion, as part of cystic fibrosis diagnosis.

Reverse iontophoresis is a technique by which molecules are removed from within the body for detection. The negative charge of the skin at buffered pH causes it to be permselective to cations such as sodium and potassium ions, allowing iontophoresis which causes electroosmosis, solvent flow towards the anode. Electroosmosis then causes electrophoresis, by which neutral molecules, including glucose, are transported across the skin. This is currently being used in such devices as the GlucoWatch, which allows for blood glucose detection across skin layers.

== See also ==
- Fick's law of diffusion
- Electrophoresis
- Electrochemical skin conductance
- Electrotherapy (cosmetic)
- Phonophoresis
