= Joseph Tonzetich =

Bad breath researcher

Dr. Joseph Tonzetich (1924–2000) is considered the modern-day pioneer in bad breath research. During the 1960s and 1970s in particular, Tonzetich and colleagues established that volatile sulfur-containing compounds were key identifiable gases in oral malodor. He also provided quantitative support for the hypothesis proposed by G.L.Grapp in the early 1930s that the back of the tongue is the major source of oral malodor.

== Biography ==
Joseph Tonzetich was born on July 15, 1924.

He was a professor from 1968 to 1990 in the Faculty of Dentistry, University of British Columbia, and donated more than $300,000 to establish a fellowship endowment fund at the university. He helped organize international meetings on the subject of diagnosis and treatment of bad breath, was a founding member of the International Society for Breath Odor Research, lectured internationally, and trained a cadre of international experts on this subject.

He died on May 25, 2000, and was interred at Ocean View Burial Park in Burnaby, British Columbia.
