= Isopropyl myristate =

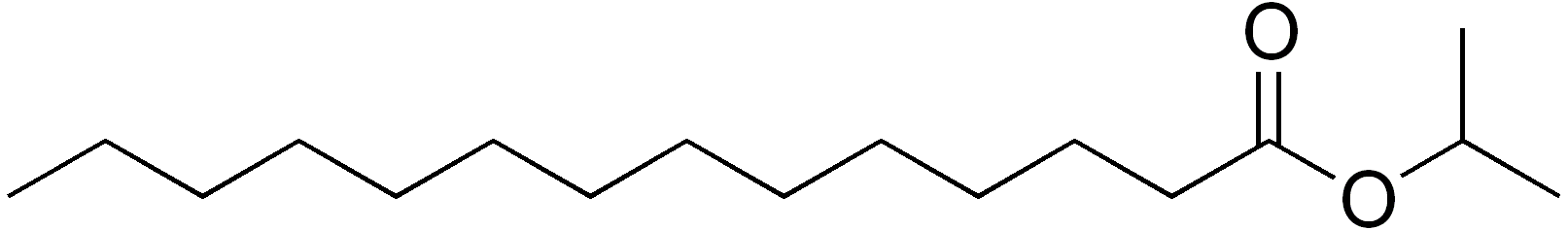
- Isopropyl myristate

Names
- Preferred IUPAC name Propan-2-yl tetradecanoate
- Other names Tetradecanoic acid, 1-methylethyl ester Myristic acid isopropyl ester

Identifiers
CAS Number	110-27-0
3D model (JSmol)	Interactive image
ChEMBL	ChEMBL207602
ChemSpider	7751
ECHA InfoCard	100.003.412
EC Number	203-751-4
KEGG	D02296
MeSH	C008205
PubChem CID	8042
RTECS number	XB8600000
UNII	0RE8K4LNJS
CompTox Dashboard (EPA)	DTXSID0026838
- InChI: InChI=1S/C17H34O2/c1-4-5-6-7-8-9-10-11-12-13-14-15-17(18)19-16(2)3/h16H,4-15H2,1-3H3 Key: AXISYYRBXTVTFY-UHFFFAOYSA-N; InChI=1/C17H34O2/c1-4-5-6-7-8-9-10-11-12-13-14-15-17(18)19-16(2)3/h16H,4-15H2,1-3H3 Key: AXISYYRBXTVTFY-UHFFFAOYAN
- SMILES: CCCCCCCCCCCCCC(=O)OC(C)C

Properties
Chemical formula	C_{17}H_{34}O_{2}
Molar mass	270.457 g·mol^{−1}
Density	0.85 g/cm^{3}
Boiling point	167 °C (333 °F; 440 K) at 9 mmHg

Hazards
NFPA 704 (fire diamond)	0 1 0
- Except where otherwise noted, data are given for materials in their standard state (at 25 °C [77 °F], 100 kPa). verify (what is ?) Infobox references

Isopropyl myristate (IPM) is the ester of isopropyl alcohol and myristic acid. It is a colorless and odorless liquid that is a common ingredient in pharmaceutical and cosmetic preparations.

== Uses ==
Isopropyl myristate is a polar emollient and is used in cosmetic and topical pharmaceutical preparations as a penetration enhancer where skin absorption is desired.

It is also used as a treatment for head lice. It is also in flea and tick killing products for pets.

It is used to remove bacteria from the oral cavity as the non-aqueous component of the two-phase mouthwash product Dentyl pH.

Isopropyl myristate is also used as a solvent in perfume materials, and in the removal process of prosthetic make-up.

Isopropyl myristate has been discovered to be the primary chemical signal emitted by queens of multiple mole-rat species, of which only one is ever present per colony, where it is detected by other colony members to suppress reproductive abilities, and violent aggression during both queen succession and reproductive competition.

Hydrolysis of the ester from isopropyl myristate can liberate the acid and the alcohol. The acid is theorized to be responsible for decreasing of the pH value of formulations.

== Adverse effects ==
Isopropyl myristate is frequently classified as a comedogenic compound and may worsen acne vulgaris and promote the development of open and closed comedones, especially when used in high concentrations. This effect is largely attributed to follicular hyperkeratosis, a process where the compound induces an abnormal accumulation of keratinocytes that forms a plug and causes an obstruction within a hair follicle.
