= Apocrine sweat gland =

One of several types of glands, in humans and other animals, that secrete sweat

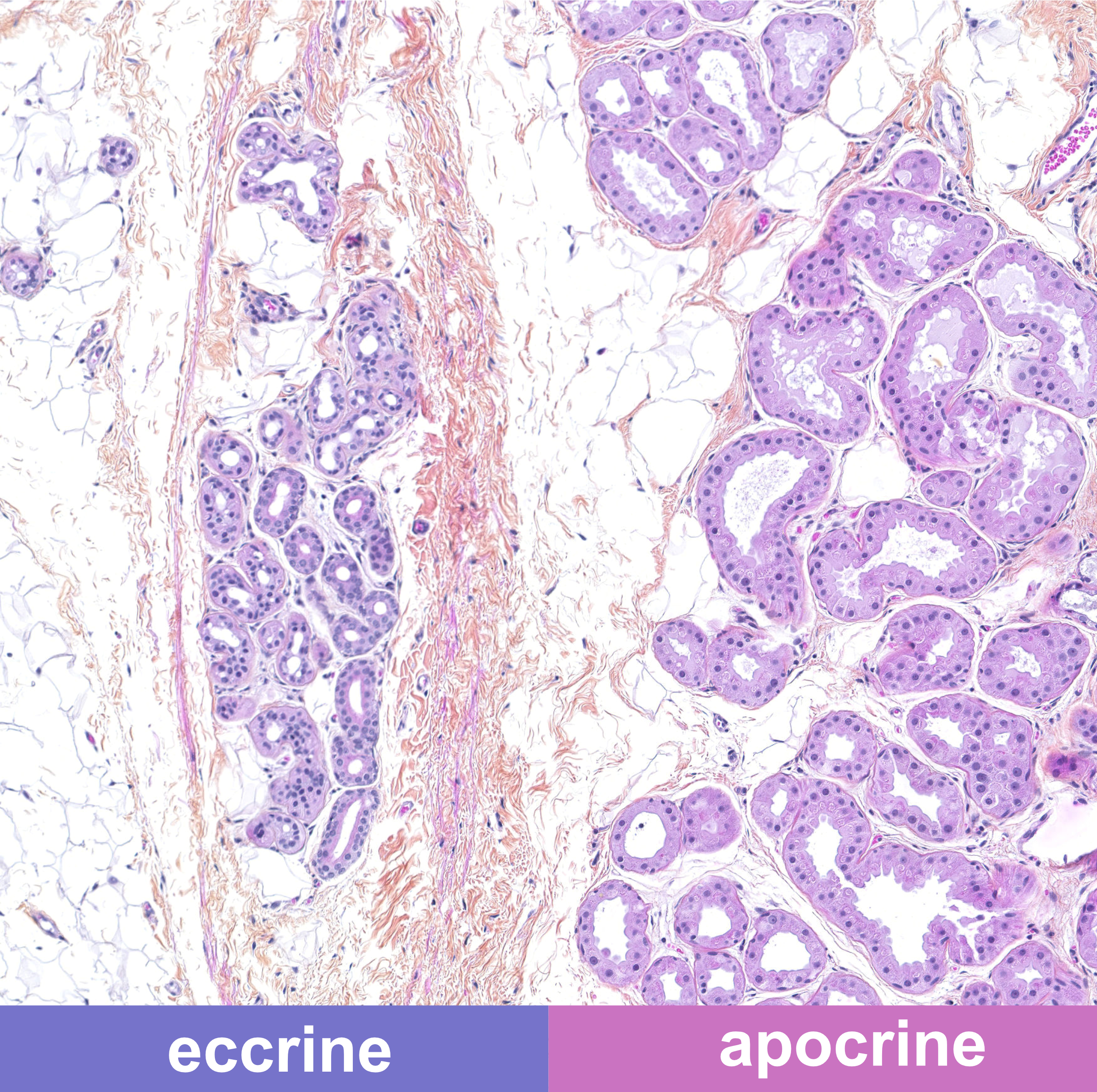
- Microscopic photography of eccrine and apocrine sweats glands in dermis.

Details
- Precursor: Primary epithelial germ
- System: Integumentary system
- Nerve: Adrenergic nerves

Identifiers
- Latin: glandula sudorifera apocrina
- MeSH: D001050
- TH: H3.12.00.3.03002
- FMA: 59155

An apocrine sweat gland (/ˈæpəkrən, -ˌkraɪn, -ˌkriːn/; from Greek apo 'away' and krinein 'to separate') is composed of a coiled secretory portion located at the junction of the dermis and subcutaneous fat, from which a straight portion inserts and secretes into the infundibular portion of the hair follicle. In humans, apocrine sweat glands are found only in certain locations of the body: the axillae (armpits), areola and nipples of the breast, ear canal, eyelids, wings of the nostril, perineal region, and some parts of the external genitalia. Modified apocrine glands include the ciliary glands (glands of Moll) in the eyelids; the ceruminous glands, which produce ear wax; and the mammary glands, which produce milk. They are distinct from eccrine sweat glands, which cover the whole body.

Most non-primate mammals, however, have apocrine sweat glands over the greater part of their body. Domestic animals such as dogs and cats have apocrine glands at each hair follicle and even in their urinary system, but eccrine glands only in foot pads and snout. Their apocrine glands, like those in humans, produce an odorless, oily, opaque secretion that gains its characteristic odor upon bacterial decomposition. Eccrine glands on their paws increase friction and prevent them from slipping when fleeing from danger.

== Structure ==
The apocrine gland is made up of a glomerulus of secretory tubules and an excretory duct that opens into a hair follicle; on occasion, an excretory duct opens to the skin surface next to the hair. The gland is large and spongy, located in the subcutaneous fat deep in the dermis, and has a larger overall structure and lumen diameter than the eccrine sweat gland. The secretory tubules of apocrine glands are single layered, but unlike the eccrine secretory tubules, contain only a single type of ductal epithelial cell, varying in diameter according to their location, and sometimes branching off into multiple ducts. The tubules are wrapped in myoepithelial cells, which are more developed than in their eccrine gland counterparts.

== Sweating ==
In hoofed animals and marsupials, apocrine glands act as the main thermoregulator, secreting watery sweat. For most mammals, however, apocrine sweat glands secrete an oily (and eventually smelly) compound that acts as a pheromone, territorial marker, and warning signal. Being sensitive to adrenaline, apocrine sweat glands are involved in emotional sweating in humans (induced by anxiety, stress, fear, sexual stimulation, and pain).

In a five-month-old human in utero, apocrine glands are distributed all over the body; after a few weeks, they exist in only restricted areas, including the armpits and external genitalia. They are inactive until stimulated by hormonal changes in puberty.

=== Mechanism ===
The apocrine gland secretes an oily fluid with proteins and lipids that is odorless before microbial activity. It appears on the skin surface mixed with sebum, as sebaceous glands open into the same hair follicle. Unlike eccrine sweat glands, which secrete continuously, the apocrine glands secrete in periodic spurts.

Apocrine sweat glands were originally thought to use only apocrine secretion: vesicles pinch off from the secretory cells, then degrade in the secretory lumen, releasing their product. More recent research has shown that merocrine secretion also takes place.

Myoepithelial cells form a smooth muscle lining around the secretory cells; when the muscles contract, they squeeze the secretory ducts and push out the accumulated fluid into the hair follicle. Sweat and sebum are mixed in the hair follicle and arrive mixed at the epidermal surface. The apocrine sweat is cloudy, viscous, initially odorless, and at a pH of 6–7.5. It contains water, protein, carbohydrate waste material, and NaCl. The sweat only attains its characteristic odor upon being degraded by bacteria, which releases volatile odor molecules. More bacteria (especially corynebacteria) leads to stronger odor. The presence of axillary hair makes the odor even more pungent, as secretions, debris, keratin, and bacteria accumulate on the hairs.

== Prevalence ==
Non-primate mammals usually have apocrine sweat glands over most of their bodies. Horses use them as a thermoregulatory device, as they are regulated by adrenaline and more widely distributed on equines than in other groups. Skunks, on the other hand, use the glands to release a secretion that acts as a powerful defense mechanism.

The "axillary organs", limited regions with equal numbers of apocrine and eccrine sweat glands, only exist in humans, gorillas, and chimpanzees. In humans, the apocrine glands in this region are the most developed (with the most complex glomeruli). Men have more apocrine sweat glands than women in all axillary regions.

There is currently no evidence that any sweat glands vary substantially by racial group, with most studies claiming to find variation being subject to methodological flaws.

== See also ==
- Eccrine sweat gland
- Exocrine gland
- Sebaceous gland
- Secretory gland
- List of distinct cell types in the adult human body
