= Adrenergic nerve fibre =

An adrenergic nerve fibre is a neuron for which the neurotransmitter is either adrenaline (epinephrine), noradrenaline or dopamine. These neurotransmitters are released at a location known as the synapse, which is a junction point between the axon of one nerve cell and the dendrite of another. The neurotransmitters are first released from the axon and then bind to the receptor site on the dendrite. Adrenergic nerve terminals are found in the secondary neurons of the sympathetic nervous system, one of two divisions of the autonomic nervous system which is responsible for the fight-or-flight response. This system increases heart rate, slows digestion, dilates pupils, and also controls the secretion of apocrine sweat glands in the dermal layer of skin, in addition to other responses.

== Composition ==
The nerve fibre is a thread-like extension of a nerve cell that includes the axon which may or may not be encased in a myelinated sheath. The androgenic nerve fibre when myelinated increases the speed of transmission for an action potential across the length of the cell. The gaps in the sheath along the axon are called the nodes of ranvier.

== Receptor site ==
=== Molecular level ===
There are several types of adrenergic receptors which are identified by their differing sensitivities to various drugs. Neurons in the central nervous system contain α1- and α2-adrenergic receptors and β1- and β2-adrenergic receptors. All four kinds of receptors are also found in the various organs of the body aside from the brain. They are responsible for the effects of epinephrine and norepinephrine when they act as hormones outside the central nervous system. In the brain, all autoreceptors appear to be of the α2 type. (The drug idazoxan blocks α2 autoreceptors and hence acts as an antagonist.) All adrenergic receptors are metabotropic, coupled to G proteins that control the production of second messengers. Adrenergic receptors can produce both excitatory and inhibitory effects. In general, the behavioral effects of the release of norepinephrine are excitatory. In the brain the α1 receptors produce a slow depolarizing (excitatory) effect on the postsynaptic membrane, while α2 receptors produce a slow hyperpolarization (inhibitory) effect. Both types of β receptors increase the responsiveness of the postsynaptic neuron to its excitatory inputs, which presumably related to the role this neurotransmitter plays in vigilance.

=== In the Body ===
Adrenergic fibres innervate smooth muscle, cardiac muscle, visceral glands, and various central nervous system structures and sense organs. Their function is enhancing, compared to the inhibiting action of the cholinergic fibres of the parasympathetic system. Peripheral adrenergic neurons integrate signals from other nerves of the central nervous system and peripheral sense organs. An adrenergic nerve impulse is triggered when one nerve fires repeatedly or when several nerves fire simultaneously which can cause an additive effect leading to a greater stimulus. Adrenergic neurons, in particular the α2 autoreceptors found in the brain, are also involved in sexual behavior and in the control of appetite.
