= Transdermal drug delivery =

Type of drug delivery method

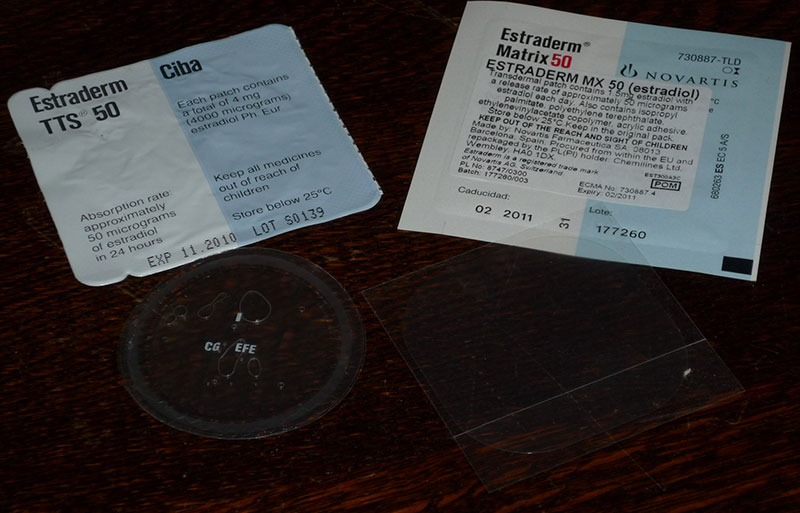
Transdermal patches. On left is a 'reservoir' type, on the right a 'matrix' version. Both contain the same level of the same active ingredient.

Transdermal drug delivery is a method of administering medications through the skin for systemic or local therapeutic effect. It typically involves the use of transdermal systems (most commonly adhesive patches) that deliver a controlled dose of a drug across the skin and into the bloodstream over an extended period. This route of administration bypasses the gastrointestinal tract and first-pass hepatic metabolism, improving bioavailability and reducing variability in drug absorption.

Transdermal delivery is used in a range of clinical applications, including hormone replacement therapy, pain management, cardiovascular conditions, and motion sickness. Compared with oral or injectable routes, it is non-invasive and may improve patient adherence, although its use is limited by the skin's barrier properties and the physicochemical characteristics required of suitable drugs.

== Methods of transdermal delivery ==
- Cream
- DMSO solution
- Hydrogel
- Iontophoresis (using electricity)
- Jet injector
- Liniment
- Lip balm
- Liposomes
- Lotion
- Medicated shampoo
- Ointment
- Paste
- Thin-film drug delivery
- Topical cream
- Topical gel
- Transdermal patch
- Transdermal spray
- Transfersome vesicles
