= Compensatory hyperhidrosis =

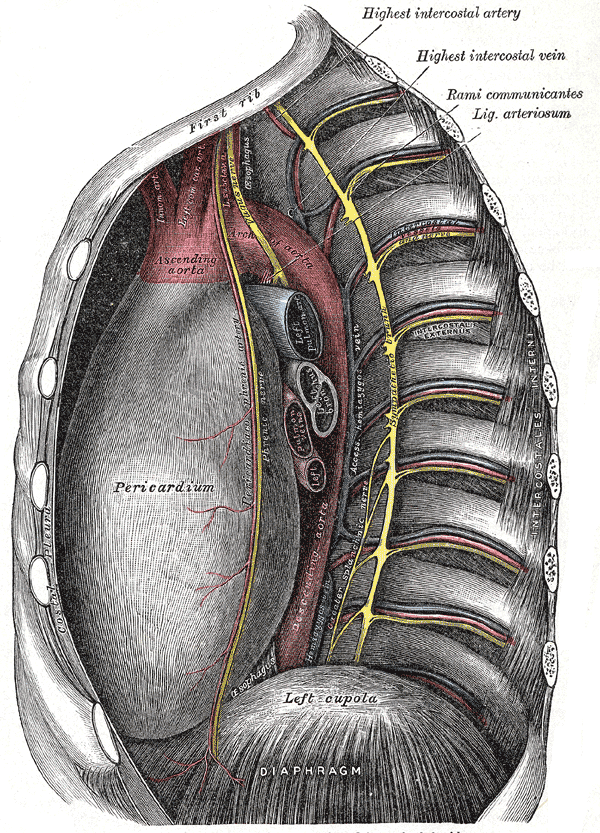
- Following Endoscopic thoracic sympathectomy surgery for axillary (armpit), palmar (palm) hyperhidrosis and blushing, the body may sweat excessively at untreated areas, most commonly the lower back and trunk, but can be spread over the total body surface below the level of the cut.

Compensatory hyperhidrosis is a form of neuropathy. It is encountered in patients with myelopathy, thoracic disease, cerebrovascular disease, nerve trauma or after surgeries. The exact mechanism of the phenomenon is poorly understood. It is attributed to the perception in the hypothalamus (brain) that the body temperature is too high. The sweating is induced to reduce body heat.

Excessive sweating due to nervousness, anger, previous trauma or fear is called hyperhidrosis.

Compensatory hyperhidrosis is the most common side effect of endoscopic thoracic sympathectomy, a surgery to treat severe focal hyperhidrosis, often affecting just one part of the body. It may also be called rebound or reflex hyperhidrosis. In a small number of individuals, compensatory hyperhidrosis following sympathectomy is disruptive, because affected individuals may have to change sweat-soaked clothing two or three times a day. According to Dr. Hooshmand, sympathectomy permanently damages the temperature regulatory system. The permanent destruction of thermoregulatory function of the sympathetic nervous system causes latent complications, e.g., RSD in contralateral extremity.

Following surgery for axillary (armpit), palmar (palm) hyperhidrosis (see focal hyperhidrosis) and blushing, the body may sweat excessively at untreated areas, most commonly the lower back and trunk, but can be spread over the total body surface below the level of the cut. The upper part of the body, above the sympathetic chain transection, the body becomes anhidrotic, where the patient is unable to sweat or cool down, which further compromises the body's thermoregulation and can lead to elevated core temperature, overheating and hyperthermia. Below the level of the sympathetic chain interruption, body temperature is significantly lower, creating a stark contrast that can be observed on thermal images. The difference in temperatures between the sympathetically under- and overactive regions can be as high as 10 Celsius.

== Variations ==
Gustatory sweating or Frey's syndrome is another presentation of autonomic neuropathy. Gustatory sweating is brought on while eating, thinking or talking about food that produces a strong salivary stimulus. It is thought that ANS fibres to salivary glands have become connected in error with the sweat glands after nerve regeneration. Apart from sweating in the anhidrotic area of the body, it can produce flushing, goosebumps, drop of body temperature - vasoconstriction and paresthesia. Aberrant gustatory sweating follows up to 73% of surgical sympathectomies and is particularly common after bilateral procedures. Facial sweating during salivation has also been described in diabetes mellitus, cluster headache, following chorda tympani injury, and following facial herpes zoster.

Phantom sweating is another form of autonomic neuropathy. It can be observed in patients with nerve damage (following accidents), diabetes mellitus and as a result of sympathectomy. Phantom sweating is a sensation that one is sweating, while the skin remains dry. Affected people can not distinguish whether it is real sweating or just a sensation. The phenomenon is experienced in the anhidrotic, denervated area of the body, presenting an abnormal sympathetic nervous system function.

== Mechanism ==
The term 'compensatory' is largely misleading, as it indicates that there is a compensatory mechanism that takes effect after sympathectomy, in which the body 'redirects' the sweating from the palms or face to other areas of the body. Sweating after sympathetic surgery is a reflex cycle between the sympathetic system and the anterior portion of the hypothalamus. Reflex sweating will not happen if hand sweating can be stopped without interrupting sympathetic tone to the human brain.

Compensatory hyperhidrosis is aberrant sympathetic nervous system functioning. The only study evaluating the total body sweat prior and shortly after sympathectomy concluded that patients produce more sweat after the surgery, just not so much in the areas treated by the surgery.

== Epidemiology ==
Of people that have a sympathectomy, it is impossible to predict who will end up with a more severe version of this disorder, as there is no link to gender, age or weight. There is no test or screening process that would enable doctors to predict who is more susceptible.
