= Palmoplantar hyperhidrosis =

Excessive sweating localized to the hands and feet

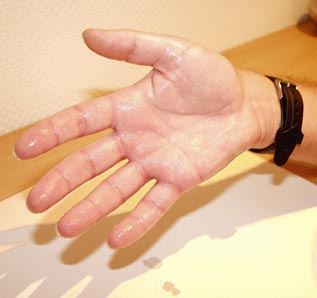
- Hyperhidrosis seen on the hands.
- Specialty: Dermatology

Palmoplantar hyperhidrosis is excessive sweating localized to the palms of the hands and soles of the feet. It is a form of focal hyperhidrosis in that the excessive sweating is limited to a specific region of the body. As with other types of focal hyperhidrosis (e.g. axillary and craniofacial) the sweating tends to worsen during warm weather.

== Signs and symptoms ==
Palmoplantar hyperhidrosis is a frequent disorder when excessive amounts of sweat are inappropriately secreted by the eccrine glands in the palms and soles.

== Causes ==
There is little knowledge about the pathogenesis of focal hyperhidrosis. Focal hyperhidrosis may indicate a complicated autonomic nervous system malfunction involving both parasympathetic and sympathetic pathways. Given that 30% to 50% of patients have a family history of hyperhidrosis, there may be a genetic susceptibility.

== Diagnosis ==
Because the excessive sweating is easily noticeable, palmoplantar hyperhidrosis is a clinical diagnosis.

== Treatment ==
For palmoplantar hyperhidrosis, 20% aluminum chloride hexahydrate in absolute anhydrous ethyl alcohol (Drysol) is the most effective topical treatment. Other topical treatments such as potassium permanganate, tannic acid (2 to 5 percent solutions), resorcinol, boric acid, formaldehyde, methenamine, and glutaraldehyde have yielded less than desirable results.

Iontophoresis is a well-known treatment for hyperhidrosis that involves applying a direct electrical current to the skin. Iontophoresis has been combined with a variety of substances, such as tap water, salt water, and anticholinergic medications.

Botulinum toxin type A (Botox) injections are safe, efficient, and frequently enhance the quality of life for those affected by hyperhidrosis. The toxin damages the sweat glands' post-ganglionic sympathetic innervation and prevents acetylcholine from being released at the neuromuscular junction.

== See also ==
- Hyperhidrosis
