= Elna Baker =

American writer and comedian (born 1982)

- Born: January 21, 1982 (age 44)
- Notable work: The New York Regional Mormon Singles Halloween Dance (memoir)
- Spouse: Mark Sikes (m. 2016, divorced)

Comedy career
- Years active: 2000s–present
- Medium: Stand-up, memoirs, essays, theatrical performances, mollyblogging
- Website: www.elnabaker.website

Elna Baker (born January 21, 1982) is an American writer and comedian. She has worked for the radio program This American Life since 2010, and is currently a producer. She has made appearances on The Moth, BBC Radio 4 and Studio 360. In October 2009, Penguin Books published her book The New York Regional Mormon Singles Halloween Dance, which chronicles her experience as a young, single Latter Day Saint living in New York City. As of April 2024, she co-hosts a podcast called Pretty Sure I Can Fly with Johnny Knoxville.

== Early life and education ==
Baker was raised as a member of the Church of Jesus Christ of Latter-day Saints in what she describes as a "half-Mexican, half-Mormon" family. After age nine, the family moved to Madrid, Spain. Their daily routine included "Bible practice," sewing lessons, and chastity instruction. Neither profanity nor magazines were permitted in the home. Her father is Gary Baker. Gary Baker ran Ural Boeing Manufacturing (UBM), a titanium factory in Russia, and then Boeing Tianjin Composites Company (BTC), a composites factory in China. He is currently Vice President, Safety, Quality & Compliance, Boeing Global Services.

Baker was accepted into the Tisch School of the Arts at New York University. When she chose the school over Brigham Young University (owned by The Church of Jesus Christ of Latter-day Saints), she says her mother asked her what she would do if a lesbian tried to make out with her. During her senior year at NYU, Baker was one of twelve students selected to write and workshop a show with the playwright Elizabeth Swados. Impressed with Baker's talent, Swados encouraged her to perform her stories live. For the rest of the semester, Baker would go over Swados's home on Fridays to learn about storytelling, a mentorship that continued for the next seven years. When a friend mentioned a club called the Moth, Baker started to go, and suddenly got to perform on the main stage when Lewis Black had to cancel at the last minute.

In her memoir, Baker recounts being overweight growing up, eventually reaching close to 265 pounds. Friends and family told her she would never be able to reach her dreams of being a wife and actress as long as she was "fat." A year after college, however, she went to a weight clinic, began a deprivation diet, and took phentermine that her doctor prescribed. She lost 110 pounds, and says she was startled and saddened to receive much positive attention she had not received before. Within a month, she got a job as an usher on David Letterman's show on CBS with the responsibility of seating people according to their physical appearances.

== Writing ==
Baker's writings and humor often relate to her experiences in New York City, coming of age as a Mormon, and the resultant abstinence from premarital sex, drugs, alcohol, and profanity. After an article she wrote for Elle magazine, she was offered the chance to write a book. To find a suitable writing environment, she applied for and was awarded residencies at both the MacDowell and Yaddo artist colonies in 2007 and 2008. In 2009, she released a memoir called The New York Regional Mormon Singles Halloween Dance, named for the annual Mormon singles dance held in New York City. Kirkus Reviews called the book "a sexy, lubricious outing by a formerly zaftig comic." People magazine gave the book four stars, calling it a "wicked-funny debut."

== Personal life ==
Baker has had cosmetic surgery to remove excess skin from her weight loss, as well as breast augmentation surgery to match her pre-weight loss breast size. She suffers from idiopathic craniofacial erythema, or chronic blushing, and for years used scarves and turtlenecks to hide it. In a 2017 episode of This American Life, she recounted losing a television role because she looked "too nervous" on camera, an incident that made her want to get surgery to correct the problem. After learning of the procedure's side effects and moderate efficacy, however, she backed away from the idea.

Baker remained a Mormon into adulthood. At 24, she got engaged to a fellow Mormon and moved to Utah to live with him, but called off the wedding when she realized she could not have the life she wanted there. She was a virgin until age 28. She left the LDS Church after the publication of her memoir.

Baker married designer Mark Sikes in 2016. The couple later divorced.
