= Minor test =

Qualitative medical test for evaluation of sweating function

- Purpose: for testing sudomotor function

The Minor test (also known as Minor's test, the starch–iodine test, and the iodine–starch test), described by Victor Minor in 1928, is a qualitative medical test that is used to evaluate sudomotor function (perspiration or sweating).

== Method ==
Tincture of iodine is applied to the skin and allowed to air-dry. After drying, the area is dusted with cornstarch or potato flour. Sweating is then encouraged by increased room temperature, exercise, use of a sauna, or pilocarpine.

When sweat reaches the surface of the skin, the starch and iodine combine, causing a drastic color change (yellow to dark blue), allowing sweat production to be easily seen.

Some have reported higher sensitivity and fewer drawbacks marking dry skin with water-erasable ink and observing fading.

== Uses ==
The Minor test can be used as a diagnostic tool to evaluate underactive (hypohidrosis) and overactive (hyperhidrosis) sweating. This test can also reveal Horner's syndrome.

== Notes ==
- Surgical Treatment of Axillary Hyperhidrosis~workup at eMedicine
- MedlinePlus Encyclopedia: Hyperhidrosis (excessive sweating)
