= Frey's syndrome =

- Other names: Auriculotemporal syndrome, Baillarger's syndrome, Dupuy's syndrome, Frey-Baillarger syndrome
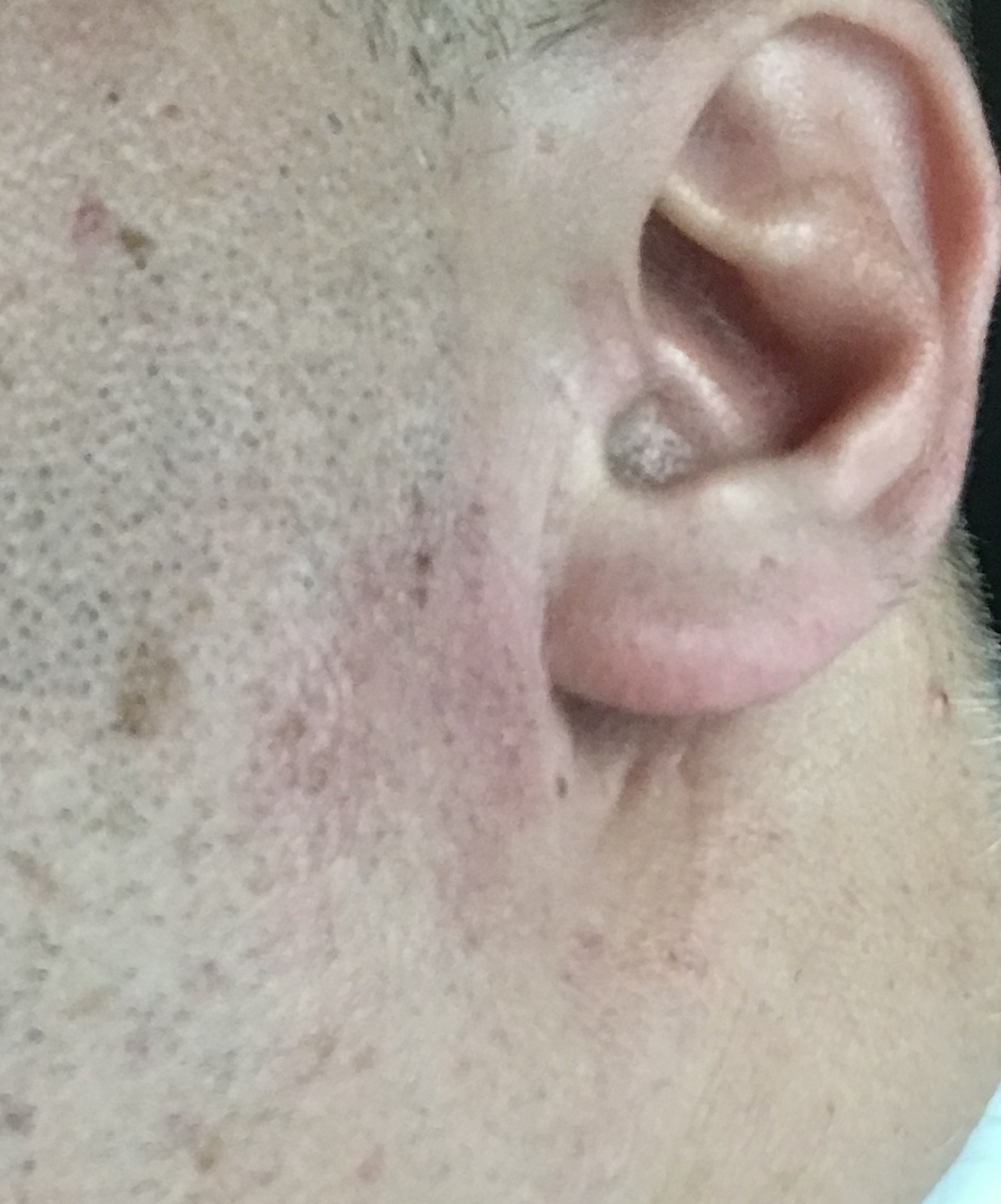
- Redness associated with Frey's syndrome
- Specialty: Neurology
- Symptoms: Redness and sweating of cheek area when salivating
- Causes: Damage to auriculotemporal nerve
- Diagnostic method: Starch-iodine test
- Frequency: 30–50% (after parotidectomy)

Frey's syndrome (also known as Baillarger's syndrome, Dupuy's syndrome, auriculotemporal syndrome, or Frey-Baillarger syndrome) is a rare neurological disorder resulting from damage to or near the parotid glands responsible for making saliva, and from damage to the auriculotemporal nerve often from surgery.

The symptoms of Frey's syndrome are redness and sweating on the cheek area adjacent to the ear (see focal hyperhidrosis). They can appear when the affected person eats, sees, dreams, thinks about, or talks about certain kinds of food which produce strong salivation. Observing sweating in the region after eating a lemon wedge may be diagnostic.

== Signs and symptoms ==
Signs and symptoms include erythema (redness or flushing) and sweating in the cutaneous distribution of the auriculotemporal nerve, usually in response to gustatory stimuli. There is sometimes pain in the same area, often burning in nature. Between attacks of pain, there may be numbness or other altered sensations (anesthesia or paresthesia). This is sometimes termed "gustatory neuralgia".

== Causes ==
Frey's syndrome often results as a complication of surgeries of or near the parotid gland or due to injury to the auriculotemporal nerve, which passes through the parotid gland in the early part of its course. The auriculotemporal branch of the mandibular branch (V3) of the trigeminal nerve carries parasympathetic fibers to the parotid salivary gland and sympathetic fibers to the sweat glands of the scalp. As a result of severance and inappropriate regeneration, the parasympathetic nerve fibers may switch course to a sympathetic response, resulting in "gustatory sweating" or sweating in anticipation of eating, instead of the normal salivary response. It is often seen with patients who have undergone endoscopic thoracic sympathectomy, a surgical procedure wherein part of the sympathetic trunk is cut or clamped to treat sweating of the hands or blushing. The subsequent regeneration or nerve sprouting leads to abnormal sweating and salivation. It can also include discharge from the nose when smelling certain food.

Rarely, Frey's syndrome can result from causes other than surgery, including accidental trauma, local infections, sympathetic dysfunction, and pathologic lesions within the parotid gland. An example of such rare trauma or localized infection can be seen in situations where a hair follicle has become ingrown and is causing trauma or localized infection near or over one of the branches of the auriculotemporal nerve.

== Diagnosis ==
Diagnosis is made based on clinical signs and symptoms and a starch-iodine test, also known as the Minor test. The affected area of the face is painted with iodine which is allowed to dry, then dry corn starch is applied to the face. The starch turns blue on exposure to iodine in the presence of sweat.

== Treatments ==
- Injection of botulinum toxin A
- Surgical transection of the nerve fibers (a temporary treatment)
- Application of an ointment containing an anticholinergic drug such as scopolamine

Cochrane reviews of interventions to either prevent or treat Frey's syndrome have found little or no evidence to support their effectiveness or safety, and conclude that further clinical trials are needed.

== Epidemiology ==
The condition is rare, although the exact incidence is unknown.

The disorder most often occurs as a complication of the surgical removal of a parotid gland (parotidectomy). The percentage of individuals who develop Frey syndrome after a parotidectomy is controversial and reported estimates range from 30 to 50 percent. In follow-up examinations, approximately 15 percent of affected individuals rated their symptoms as severe. Frey syndrome affects males and females in equal numbers.

== History ==
It is named after Łucja Frey-Gottesman. The disorder was first reported in medical literature by Baillarger in 1853. A neurologist from Poland, Dr. Lucja Frey, provided a detailed assessment of the disorder and coined the term "auriculotemporal syndrome" in 1923.
