= Galvanic urticaria =

- Specialty: Dermatology

Galvanic urticaria has been described after exposure to a galvanic (electrical) device used to treat hyperhidrosis.

== See also ==
- Urticaria
- Skin lesion
