= Idiopathic craniofacial erythema =

Medical condition

Idiopathic craniofacial erythema is a medical condition characterized by uncontrollable and frequently unprovoked facial blushing.

Blushing can occur at any time and is frequently triggered by even mundane events, such as talking to friends, paying for goods in a shop, asking for directions or even simply making eye contact with another person.

This medical condition characterized by severe, frequent and uncontrollable reddening of the face, which is often unprovoked. It is unknown why people are afflicted with this condition, but it appears to be the result of an overactive sympathetic nervous system, an automatic response which sufferers have no mental control over. It is related to focal hyperhidrosis, more commonly known as excessive sweating, as it is caused by the same overactive nerves which cause excessive sweating. Sufferers of severe facial blushing commonly experience focal hyperhidrosis. Studies have also shown that patients with severe facial blushing or focal hyperhidrosis commonly have family members with one or both of the related disorders.

== In popular culture ==
- In Grey's Anatomy Season 2, Episode 3, a patient is diagnosed with idiopathic craniofacial erythema.
- The female protagonist in the South Korean drama Heart to Heart suffers from uncontrollable blushing, that leaves her sociophobic.

== Treatment ==
A number of treatments are available. Options for conservative treatment for chronic blushing include oral medications and behavioral therapy. Several types of medications are used as treatment for idiopathic craniofacial erythema. Anxiolytics, such as diazepam, are used for anxiety; beta-blockers, which blunt the body's reaction to stress; or anticholinergic drugs, such as glycopyrronium, oxybutynin, or propanthelin.

The most successful non-invasive procedure is cognitive behavioural therapy (CBT), which attempts to alleviate the anxiety felt by sufferers.

In extreme cases a surgical procedure known as endoscopic transthoracic sympathicotomy (ETS) is available. Pioneered by surgeons in Sweden, this procedure has recently become increasingly controversial due to its many potential adverse effects. Patients who have undergone the procedure frequently complain of compensatory sweating and fatigue, with around 5% reconsidering getting the treatment. ETS is now normally only considered in extreme cases where other treatments have been ineffective.
