= Botanix Pharmaceuticals =

Australian pharmaceutical company

Botanix Pharmaceuticals Limited
- Type: Listed Public Company
- Traded as: ASX: BOT
- Industry: Biotechnology
- Headquarters: Perth, Western Australia, and Philadelphia, USA
- Area served: Global
- Key people: Vince Ippolito, President and executive chairman; Matt Callahan, Founder and executive director; Dr Stewart Washer, Director; Dr Bill Bosch, Chief scientific officer and executive director; Danny Sharp, Non-executive director
- Products: BTX 1503 | For the treatment of moderate to severe acne BTX 1702 | For the treatment of rosacea BTX 1204A | For the treatment of moderate atopic dermatitis BTX 1801 | For use in a variety of antimicrobial applications
- Website: www.botanixpharma.com

Botanix Pharmaceuticals is listed on the Australian Securities Exchange with the issue code BOT. The Company is headquartered in Perth, Western Australia and Philadelphia, USA. It is a clinical stage synthetic cannabinoid company, focusing on the compound Cannabidiol. The company's lead product is Sofdra, which treats axillary hyperhidrosis. The company has two separate development platforms, dermatology and antimicrobial. Botanix also has an exclusive license to use a proprietary drug delivery system Permetrex, for direct skin delivery of active pharmaceuticals which is utilised in all of their programs.

== Research ==
Botanix Pharmaceuticals' product pipeline currently includes four programs for treatment of serious skin diseases:

Dermatology

- BTX 1503, for the treatment of moderate to severe acne
- BTX 1702, for the treatment of rosacea
- BTX 1204A, for the treatment of moderate atopic dermatitis

Antimicrobial

- BTX 1801, for use in a variety of antimicrobial applications
