= Sweat diagnostics =

- Purpose: test for Eccrine sweat gland(mostly)

Sweat diagnostics is an emerging non-invasive technique used to provide insights to the health of the human body. Common sweat diagnostic tests include testing for cystic fibrosis and illicit drugs. Most testing of human sweat is in reference to the eccrine sweat gland which in contrast to the apocrine sweat gland, has a lower composition of oils.

Although sweat is mostly water, there are many solutes which are found in sweat that have at least some relation to biomarkers found in blood. These include: sodium (Na^{+}), chloride (Cl^{−}), potassium (K^{+}), ammonium (NH^{+}_{4}), alcohols, lactate, peptides & proteins. Development of devices, sensing techniques and biomarker identification in sweat continues to be an expanding field for medical diagnostics and athletics applications.

The use of smart biosensors for on-skin sweat analysis has been described as internet-enabled Sudorology (iSudorology) by Brasier et al. in 2019. It describes the lab-independent detection of molecular, next-generation digital biomarkers in sweat.

== History ==
Some of the earliest, published studies on sweat composition date back to the 19th century. Further studies in the 20th century began to solidify understanding of the physiology and pharmacology of the eccrine sweat gland. In-vivo and in-vitro studies from this time period, and even those continuing today, have identified numerous structural nuances and new molecules present within sweat. The first commercially adopted use for sweat diagnostics included testing of sodium and chloride levels in children for the diagnosis of cystic fibrosis. Today, one of the most popular devices for this testing is the Macroduct Sweat Collection System from ELITechGroup.

== General evidence ==
More recently, numerous studies have identified the plausibility of sweat as an alternative to blood analysis. The potential substitution for sweat versus blood analysis has many potential benefits. For example, sweat can be: extracted in a non-invasive manner via iontophoresis; extracted with little-to-no pain; and monitored continuously. There are downfalls to the technology, however. For example, demonstration of successful and reliable sweat extraction and analysis on a cohesive device has yet to be demonstrated. Furthermore, although some biomarker partitioning mechanisms are well understood and well studied, partitioning of other useful biomarkers (cytokines, peptides, etc.) are less understood.

== Current research ==
=== Portable devices ===
==== Patches ====
Patches have been demonstrated to be a promising detection platform for sweat diagnostics. Simple, long-term collection devices which check for drugs of abuse or alcohol are already on the market and operate on the following principle: a user applies the patch which then collects sweat over a period of hours or days, then the patch is analyzed utilizing techniques such as GC-MS which are accurate but have the drawback of lack of continuous measurements and high costs. For example, sweat diagnostic products for illicit drugs and alcohol are manufactured and supplied by PharmChek and AlcoPro, respectively. Recently several efforts have been made to develop low cost polymer based continuous perspiration monitoring devices and are in early stages of commercialization.

More recently, startup companies such as Xsensio have begun developing products targeted towards the consumer, healthcare and athletics market for sweat diagnostics. Ultimately, it is the hope that these devices will have the ability to detect changes in human physiology within minutes without the need for repeated sample collection and analysis.

==== Temporary tattoos ====
Temporary tattoo-based sweat diagnostic tools have been demonstrated by Dr. Joseph Wang's group from University of California, San Diego. Their work includes sweat diagnostics for sodium, lactate, ammonium, pH and biofuel opportunities.
