= Heart to Heart (South Korean TV series) =

2015 South Korean television drama

- Promotional poster
- Genre: Romance; Comedy; Medical drama
- Written by: Lee Jung-ah
- Directed by: Lee Yoon-jung
- Starring: Choi Kang-hee; Chun Jung-myung; Lee Jae-yoon
- Country of origin: South Korea
- Original language: Korean
- No. of episodes: 16

Production
- Production companies: Chorokbaem Media; Story Plant (Note: Now Mega Monster, a joint venture of kakao M and Studio Dragon)

Original release
- Network: tvN
- Release: January 9 – March 7, 2015

Heart to Heart (Korean: 하트 투 하트; RR: Hateu tu hateu) is a 2015 South Korean television series starring Choi Kang-hee and Chun Jung-myung. It is directed by Lee Yoon-jung, and written by Lee Jung-ah, the writer-director duo of the famous Coffee Prince. It aired on tvN from January 9 to March 7, 2015, on Fridays at 20:30 for 16 episodes.

== Plot ==
Go Yi-seok (Chun Jung-myung) is a successful psychiatrist with a best-selling book and talk show appearances under his belt. Though loving, sensitive and caring towards his family, he is also insecure, egocentric and suffers from an inferiority complex, caused by his childhood experiences. The resulting juvenile behaviour renders him incapable of forming meaningful relationships with women. To make matters worse, he's gradually developing a phobia of his patients, being unable to empathise with their whining — which drives him to drink while on duty.

Cha Hong-do (Choi Kang-hee) is a bright, confident and opinionated woman, whose uncontrollable blushing has left her with crippling sociophobia and caused her to drop out from high school. She ventures outside her home only when shielded by a helmet, and works under the guise as an old grandmother. She nurses a crush of seven years on the kind detective Jang Doo-soo (Lee Jae-yoon), and expresses her feelings by secretly delivering food with notes to his doorstep.

A chance hearing of Doo-soo's blind-date arrangements and upon reading Yi-seok's book, Hong-do is spurred and encouraged to approach Yi-seok's clinic for treatment so that she can speak to Doo-soo freely face-to-face. A disastrous first encounter leads to Hong-do mistakenly accusing Yi-seok of murder, and ends with Yi-seok discovering that his phobia disappears when Hong-do is around, while she uncovers his vulnerable side hidden underneath the swagger.

Mutual dependency forces the two to work together, and both slowly realise how beneficial their companionship is to each other. His skill as a psychiatrist allows her real self to blossom into the open, while her inner strength and steadfastness helps him overcome his hidden insecurities.

Entanglements arise when Doo-soo belatedly realises his own feelings for Hong-do, and begins to pursue her actively, throwing a spanner into the budding relationship. To complicate things further, Yi-seok's sister, Go Se-ro, (Ahn So-hee) falls for Doo-soo. Things come to a head for the couple when the Go family's dark past begins to unravel and threatens to drive a nail into the coffin of their bond.

== Cast ==
- Choi Kang-hee as Cha Hong-do/Oh Young-rae
  - Heo Jung-eun as young Hong-do
- Chun Jung-myung as Go Yi-seok
  - Nam Da-reum as young Yi-seok
- Lee Jae-yoon as Jang Doo-soo
- Ahn So-hee as Go Se-ro, Yi-seok's sister
- Joo Hyun as Go Sang-gyu, Yi-seok's grandfather
- Kim Ki-bang as Detective Yang
- Um Hyo-sup as Go Jae-woong, Yi-seok's father
- Jin Hee-kyung as Hwang Moon-sun, Yi-seok's mother
- Park Hee-jin as Talk show host
- Choi Su-rin as Doctor Uhm's friend
- Hwang Seung-eon as Woo Yeon-woo, Yi-seok's girlfriend
- Seo Yi-sook as Psychiatrist Uhm Ki-choon
- Choi Moo-sung as Butler Ahn Byung-yeol
- Kim Ae-kyung as Housekeeper Hwang Geum-shim
- Lee Moon-jung as Curator (cameo)
- Lee Bit-na as teenage Cha Hong-do (cameo Ep.1)
- Choi Daniel as Bakery owner (cameo appearance)
- Ryu Hye-young as Lee Eun-ho/Lee Jin-ho

== Ratings ==
In this table, the blue numbers represent the lowest ratings and the red numbers represent the highest ratings.

Ep.	Original broadcast date	Average audience share
Ep.	Original broadcast date	AGB Nielsen
Ep.	Original broadcast date	Nationwide
1	January 9, 2015	1.26%
2	January 10, 2015	0.95%
3	January 16, 2015	1.45%
4	January 17, 2015	1.34%
5	January 23, 2015	1.94%
6	January 24, 2015	1.59%
7	January 30, 2015	2.45%
8	January 31, 2015	1.64%
9	February 6, 2015	1.52%
10	February 7, 2015	1.20%
11	February 13, 2015	2.08%
12	February 14, 2015	1.50%
13	February 27, 2015	1.37%
14	February 28, 2015	1.20%
15	March 6, 2015	1.39%
16	March 7, 2015	1.42%
Average		1.52%

- This drama airs on a cable channel/pay TV which normally has a relatively smaller audience compared to free-to-air TV/public broadcasters (KBS, SBS, MBC and EBS).
