= Blushing =

Reddening of a person's face due to emotion

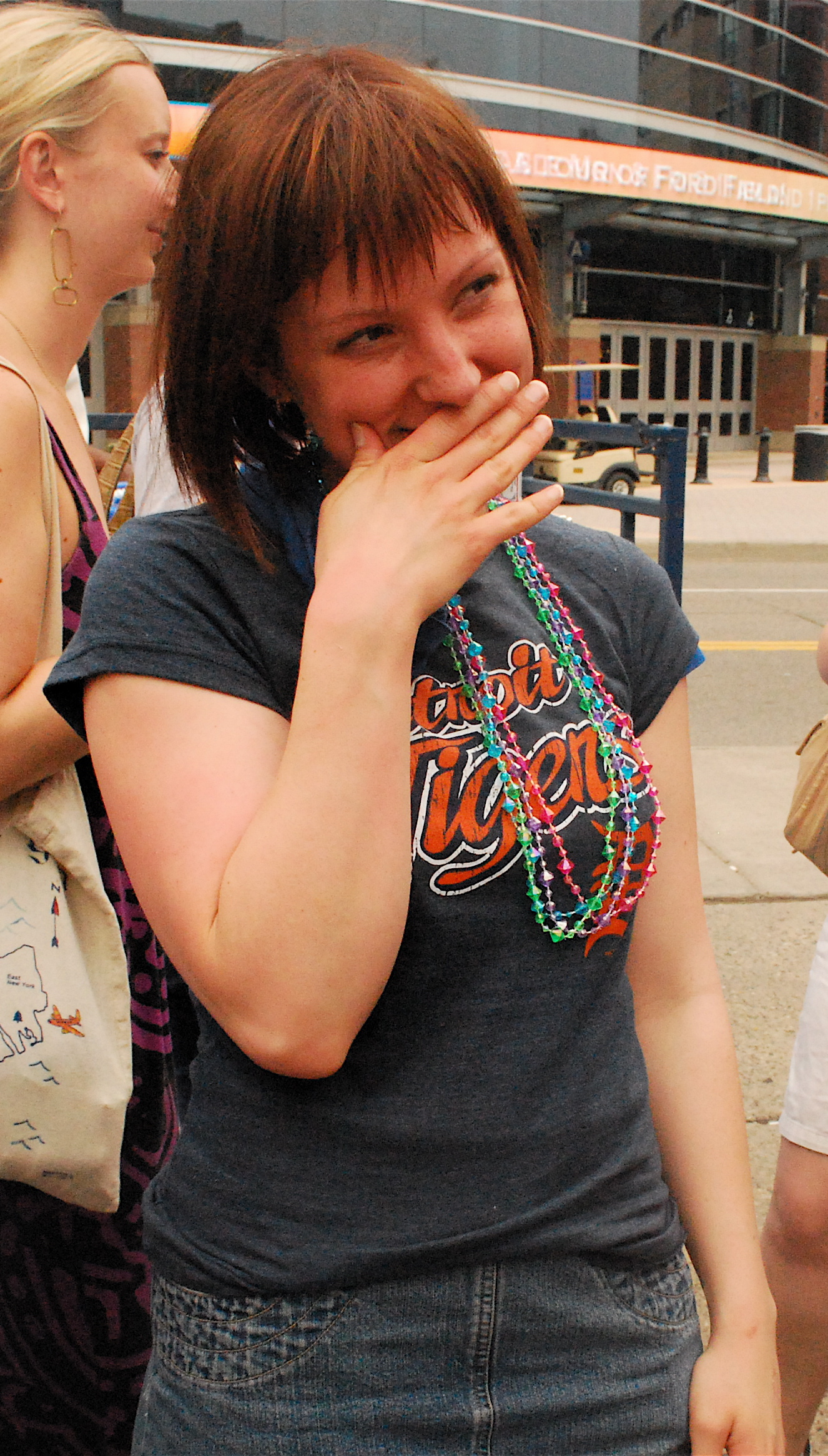
A woman blushing and covering her face

Blushing or erubescence is the reddening of a person's face due to psychological reasons. It is normally involuntary and triggered by emotional stress associated with passion, embarrassment, shyness, fear, anger, or romantic stimulation.

Severe blushing is also common in people who have social anxiety, in which the person experiences extreme and persistent anxiety in social and performance situations.

== Description ==
Blushing is generally distinguished, despite a close physiological relation, from flushing, which is more intensive and extends over more of the body and seldom has a mental source. Idiopathic craniofacial erythema is a medical condition where a person blushes strongly with little or no provocation. People who have social phobia are particularly prone to idiopathic craniofacial erythema.

== Physiology ==
A blush is a reddening of the cheeks and forehead brought about by increased capillary blood flow in the skin. It can also extend to the ears, neck and upper chest, an area termed the 'blush region'.

There is evidence that the blushing region is anatomically different in structure. The facial skin, for example, has more capillary loops per unit area and generally more vessels per unit volume than other skin areas. In addition, blood vessels of the cheek are wider in diameter, are nearer the surface, and visibility is less diminished by tissue fluid. These specific characteristics of the architecture of the facial vessels led Wilkin in an overview of possible causes of facial flushing to the following conclusion: "[...] Increased capacity and greater visibility can account for the limited distribution of flushing".

Evidence for special vasodilation mechanisms was reported by Mellander and his colleagues (Mellander, Andersson, Afzelius, & Hellstrand, 1982). They studied buccal segments of the human facial veins in vitro. Unlike veins from other areas of the skin, facial veins responded with an active myogenic contraction to passive stretch and, therefore, were able to develop an intrinsic basal tone. Additionally Mellander et al. showed that the veins in this specific area were also supplied with beta-adrenoceptors in addition to the common alpha-adrenoceptors. These beta-adrenoceptors could exert a dilator mechanism on the above-described basal tone of the facial cutaneous venous plexus. Mellander and his colleagues propose that this mechanism is involved in emotional blushing.

Drummond has partially confirmed this effect by pharmacological blocking experiments (Drummond. 1997). In a number of trials, he blocked both alpha-adrenergic receptors (with phentolamine) and beta-adrenergic receptors (with propranolol introduced transcutaneously by iontophoresis). Blushing was measured at the forehead using a dual channel laser Doppler flowmeter. Subjects were undergraduate students divided into frequent and infrequent blushers according to self-report. Their mean age was 22.9 years, which is especially favorable for assessing blushing since young subjects are more likely to blush and blush more intensively. The subjects underwent several procedures, one of which was designed to produce blushing.

Alpha-adrenergic blockade with phentolamine did not influence the amount of blushing in frequent or infrequent blushers, indicating that the release of sympathetic vasoconstrictor tone does not substantially influence blushing. This result was expected since vasoconstrictor tone in the facial area is known to be generally low (van der Meer. 1985). Beta-adrenergic blockade with propranolol, on the other hand, decreased blushing in both frequent and infrequent blushers. However, despite complete blockade, blood flow still increased substantially during the embarrassment and blushing inducing procedure. Additional vasodilator mechanisms must, therefore, be involved.

== Psychology ==
Charles Darwin devoted Chapter 13 of his 1872 The Expression of the Emotions in Man and Animals to complex emotional states including self-attention, shame, shyness, modesty and blushing. He described blushing as "... the most peculiar and most human of all expressions."

Several different psychological and psycho-physiological mechanisms for blushing have been hypothesized by Crozier (2010): "An explanation that emphasizes the blush's visibility proposes that when we feel shame, we communicate our emotion to others, and in doing so we send an important signal to them. It tells them something about us. It shows that we are ashamed or embarrassed, that we recognise that something is out of place. It shows that we are sorry about this. It shows that we want to put things right. To blush at innuendo is to show awareness of its implications and to display modesty that conveys that you are not brazen or shameless. The blush makes a particularly effective signal because it is involuntary and uncontrollable. Of course, a blush can be unwanted [but the] costs to the blusher on specific occasions are outweighed by the long-term benefits of being seen as adhering to the group and by the general advantages the blush provides: indeed the costs may enhance the signal's perceived value." A number of techniques may be used to help prevent or reduce blushing. The most extreme of these interventions is a surgical technique known as endoscopic thoracic sympathectomy.

Salzen (2010) suggested that blushing and flushing were manifestations of the physiological impact of the instinctual fight/flight mechanism when neither confrontation nor retreat is possible.

Blushing has been linked to activation in the cerebellum and the left paracentral lobe.

== See also ==
- Endoscopic thoracic sympathectomy
