= Parotidectomy =

Surgical removal of the parotid gland

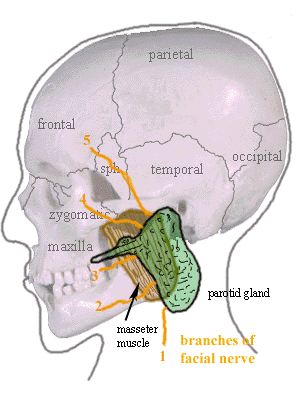
- This image shows the general anatomy of the parotid gland and its associated structures.
- Specialty: Endocrinology

A parotidectomy is the surgical excision (removal) of the parotid gland, the major and largest of the salivary glands. The procedure is most typically performed due to neoplasms (tumors), which are growths of rapidly and abnormally dividing cells. Neoplasms can be benign (non-cancerous) or malignant (cancerous). The majority of parotid gland tumors are benign, however 20% of parotid tumors are found to be malignant. Parotidectomy is performed mostly by oral and maxillofacial surgeon and ENT surgeon.

== Anatomy ==
There are two parotid glands in the human body. Each parotid gland is located high in the neck just below the ears. A salivary duct by which saliva is secreted (produced and released), runs through the inside of each cheek from each gland. Furthermore, the extratemporal (outside temporal bone) facial nerve and its subsidiaries run through the parotid gland and innervate (supply nerves to) the face. This nerve articulates the muscles for facial expression as well as more specific muscles such as the postauricular muscles, the posterior (back or end) belly of the digastric muscle, and the stylohyoid muscles.

== Diagnosis ==
Painless, noticeably felt growths are the most common presentations described in medical literature. Benign parotid gland neoplasms typically present after the age of 40 and have an equal presentation in both genders. Malignant growths predominantly affect women over the age of 60. The most common form of benign parotid neoplasms are pleomorphic adenomas and Warthin's tumor. The most common form of malignant parotid neoplasms are mucoepidermoid carcinomas. The exact cause of malignant parotid tumors is still unknown, however they can be caused by metastasis (spread of cancer) from other areas of the body, certain work exposures, reduced immunity, HIV, as well as radiation exposure. Contrary to other cancers, it is believed that smoking and drinking do not influence salivary gland malignancies. Inflammation ailments of the parotid gland, such as parotid abscesses (collections of pus), deep salivary calculi (mineral deposits), and chronic parotitis (long-term inflammation) may necessitate a total parotidectomy. Also, sialorrhea (excessive salivation) may be remedied by a parotidectomy, yet treatment by medication or even duct ligation (surgical tying) are the less invasive approaches.

== Treatment/Procedure ==
Many different approaches are possible and variation naturally depends on the type of case. A parotidectomy is an inpatient (i.e. within a hospital) procedure versus an outpatient (clinic or out of hospital) procedure.

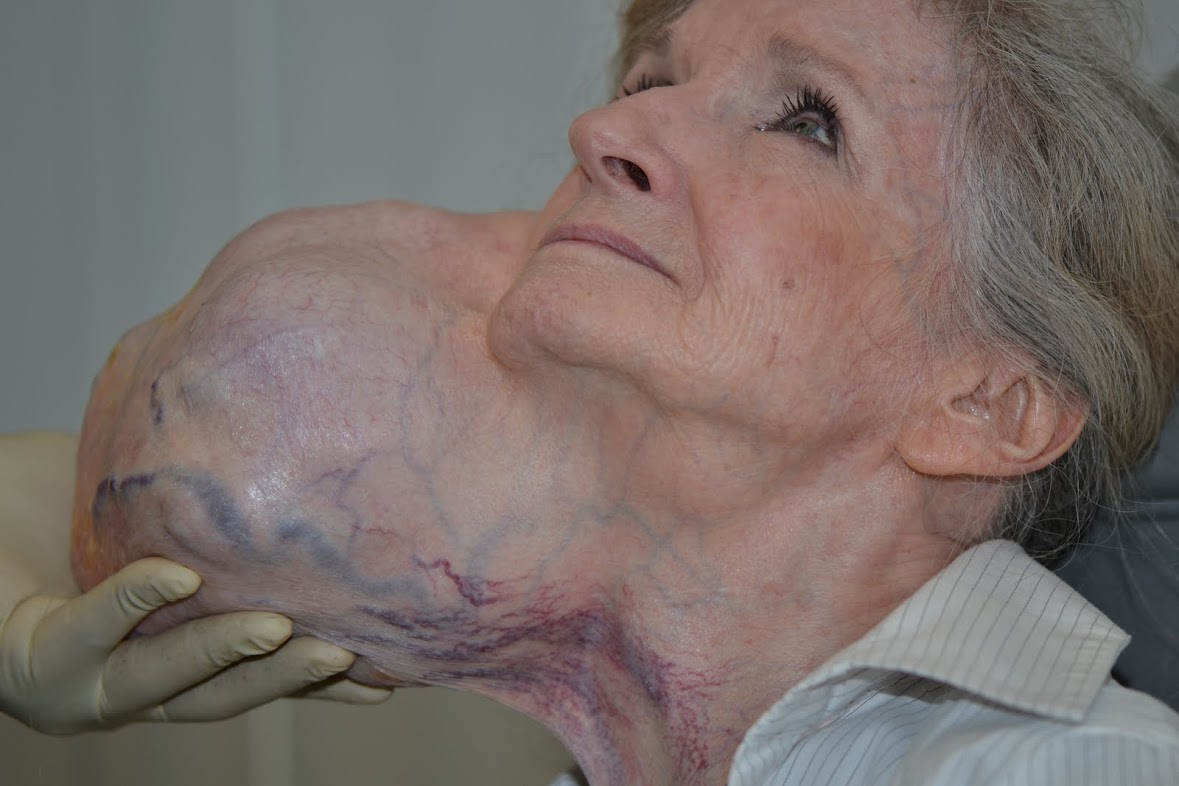
A 71-year-old woman diagnosed with a massive salivary gland mixed tumour, also known as pleomorphic adenoma.

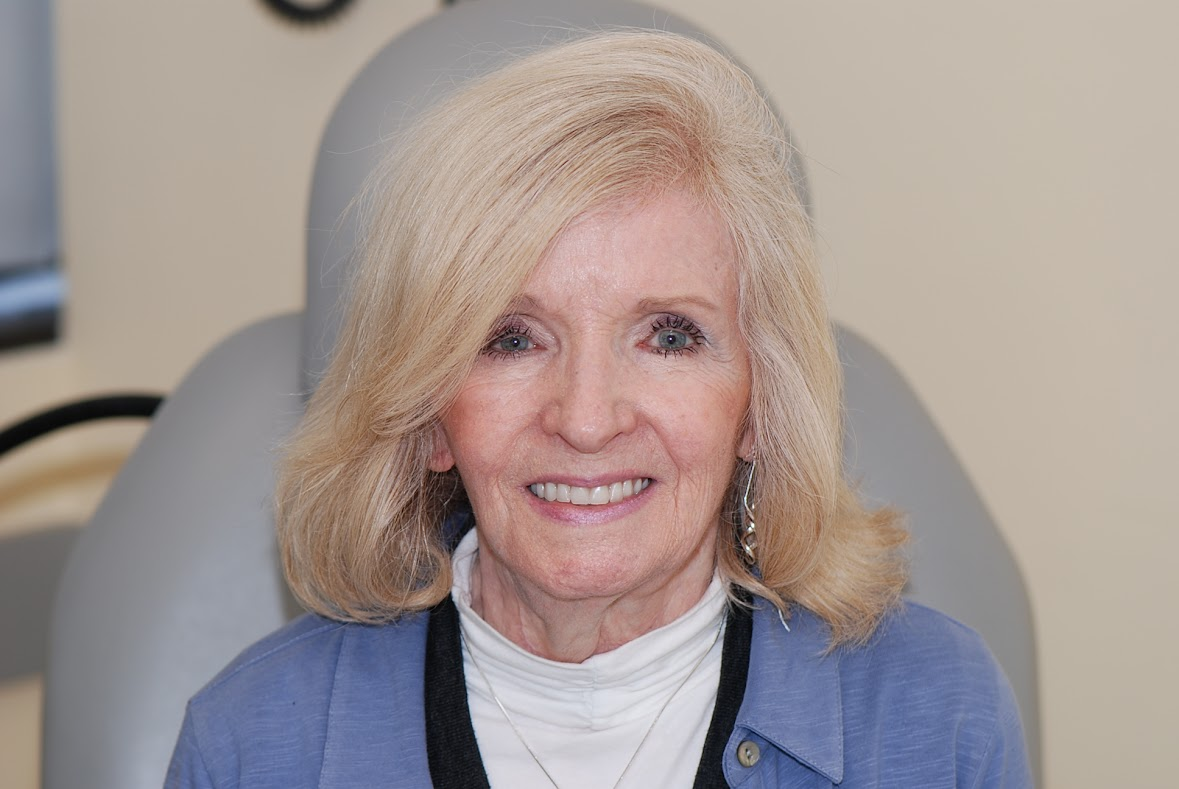
The same woman as above, after a parotidectomy.

=== Types ===
Throughout history, many different types and techniques have been developed in order to complete a parotidectomy and consequently, many different names have been associated with each type. However, there are really only two main distinctions to be made in parotidectomies:

1. The specific nerve(s) to be dissected or not dissected
2. The amount of gland excised

The specific surgery chosen is based on preservation of the facial nerve in order to avoid significant morbidities (diseases). Furthermore, there are still many controversies regarding the choice of surgery and incidence of cancer recurrence. Below indicates the various and main techniques typically associated with a parotidectomy:

- Extracapsular dissection - excision of the parotid tumor surrounded by some millimetres of healthy tissue, without searching and exposing the main truck of the facial nerve.
- superficial (near surface) or lateral (side) parotidectomy - excising all the parts of the gland superficial or lateral to the facial nerve.

–partial superficial parotidectomy - superficial parotidectomy where the surgeon excises only the portion of the gland surrounding the neoplasm. Only some nerves of the face are dissected during this procedure.
–formal superficial parotidectomy - superficial parotidectomy where the cervicofacial and temporofacial nerves are dissected.

- total parotidectomy - total removal of the deep part of the parotid gland. Typically performed if neoplasm is affecting deep part of parotid gland. Surgeon tries to remove the gland apart from the facial nerve, yet dissecting all branches of the facial nerves. This method can be done using the transcervical surgical approach.

–transcervical approach - less invasive procedure that involves cutting only a small incision in the neck.

- radical parotidectomy - Typically performed if malignant neoplasm is impinging on facial nerve. Facial nerve excised in addition to parotid gland.

=== Pre-Operation ===
Many measures before a parotidectomy may be instituted before surgery. Some of these include diagnostic imaging, fine-needle aspiration, neck dissection, and antibiotic prophylaxis (treatment to prevent).

- Diagnostic imaging - computer tomography (CT) scans or magnetic resonance imaging (MRI)

–conducted to help the surgeon locate the tumor and address complications (i.e. the extent of the neoplasm and its resulting excision).

- Fine-needle aspiration - technique in helping the surgeon to physically diagnose the malignancy of the tumor
- Neck dissection - only considered in the most extreme of cases before a parotidectomy.

=== Procedure ===
General anaesthetic is given and the patient is put to sleep. In the most general of surgeries, incisions (cuts or slices) are made near the crease of the ear or posttragally (behind the tragus), as in a facelift, and continued behind the ear. The surgeon takes consideration to not distort the anatomy of the ear. A flap is made on the surface of the parotid gland to help expose the gland and tissue to be removed. Veins and nerve branches are identified and if necessary, specific nerves are dissected. Facial nerve monitoring has been found to reduce nerve associated morbidities. Dissection of the nerves takes place in order to avoid any stimulation while operating. Once necessary parotid tissue is removed, facial nerves are tested for correct function and reconstruction begins. The procedure usually is performed in two to five hours depending on the patient and surgeon.

=== Post-Operation ===
After completion of a parotidectomy, patients can expect postoperative hospitalization ranging from one-to-three days, to help ensure the safest and most effective postoperative management. At this time, patients will be administered antibiotics to minimize risk of infection as well as an assessment of pain management throughout their stay. Duration of hospitalization is subject to change from patient to patient, with most patients being discharged within 24 hours after surgery. If a tumor was malignant, many patients are referred to radiation therapy. For benign tumors and slow growing cancers, surgery typically provides a complete cure or remission (no evidence for disease).

== Patient Care after Discharge ==
Patients are typically discharged from the hospital with sutures (stitches) at the incision site, and a small drain tube placed behind the ear. The tube is connected to a plastic bulb, which collects blood, serum, and saliva from the wound. Sutures are typically removed between the fourth and sixth day post-surgery. After suture removal, the patient is typically seen in the clinic two-four weeks until healing is complete. If a biopsy is taken, pathology results typically may be reviewed in three-five business days in the clinic. Long-term follow-up will be determined based on the results of the pathology. Most patients with benign tumors are followed every three-six months for two years and yearly thereafter. Patients with malignant tumors may be followed every two-three months for two years, and then every six months for five years after procedure. Not every patient heals in exactly the same way, which is why dates of removal for the drain or sutures are based upon each specific patient and case. Should the patient have difficulty smiling, winking, or consuming fluids, the physician should be contacted immediately, as these are common signs of facial nerve damage. Mild facial numbness and weakness are normal immediately after a parotidectomy, with symptoms usually subsiding within a few months. Most patients regain full facial function within one year of the procedure.

== Complications ==
Complications that may occur due to parotidectomy involve nerve dysfunction, Frey’s syndrome (uncharacteristic sweating near glands), salivation from wound, numbness, facial asymmetry, necrosis (death of skin) near incision, and tumor reappearance.

== Prognosis ==
There is a 25-50% risk of facial weakness directly after parotidectomy and a 1-2% risk of permanent weakness. Frey’s syndrome may occur in up to 90% of patients. Risk of mortality is very low in reference to the surgery. In a case of benign tumor, such as pleomorphic adenoma, a significant outcome is also the rate of tumor recurrence. Pleomorphic adenomas may recur after a very long time from primary surgery, on average over 7–10 years and up to 24 years.

Survival rates due to malignancy depends on the patient and extent of disease. A 10-year survival ranges from 32-83%. Of all cancers, salivary gland tumors account for only 1%. Parotid tumors account for 7% of all head and neck cancers.

== Etymology ==
The root of the word parotidectomy, parotid, refers to the parotid gland meaning “situated near the ear” from the Greek para- “beside” and ous “the ear.” The suffix -ectomy is also derived from Greek which means literally “to cut out.”

== See also ==
- Parotid gland
- Salivary gland
- Otolaryngology
- Neoplasm
