= Glycopyrronium tosylate =

Chemical compound

Clinical data
- Trade names: Qbrexza, Rapifort
- Other names: Glycopyrronium tosilate hydrate (JAN JP)
- AHFS/Drugs.com: Monograph
- License data: US DailyMed: Glycopyrronium
- Routes of administration: Topical
- Drug class: Muscarinic antagonist
- ATC code: D11AA01 (WHO)

Legal status
- Legal status: US: ℞-only; In general: ℞ (Prescription only)

Identifiers
- CAS Number: 1624259-25-1
- PubChem CID: 121225724
- DrugBank: DBSALT002800
- ChemSpider: 58902513
- UNII: 1PVF6JLU7B
- KEGG: D10939
- ChEMBL: ChEMBL3707243

Chemical and physical data
- 3D model (JSmol): Interactive image
- SMILES: O.Cc1ccc(cc1)S(=O)(=O)[O-].C[N+]2(C)CC[C@@H](C2)OC(=O)[C@@](O)(C3CCCC3)c4ccccc4
- InChI: InChI=1S/C19H28NO3.C7H8O3S.H2O/c1-20(2)13-12-17(14-20)23-18(21)19(22,16-10-6-7-11-16)15-8-4-3-5-9-15;1-6-2-4-7(5-3-6)11(8,9)10;/h3-5,8-9,16-17,22H,6-7,10-14H2,1-2H3;2-5H,1H3,(H,8,9,10);1H2/q+1;;/p-1/t17-,19-;;/m0../s1; Key:UOWOLENSDISMPG-FFUVTKDNSA-M

Glycopyrronium tosylate, sold under the brand name Qbrexza in the United States, is a medication used for the treatment of primary axillary hyperhidrosis.

It was approved for medical use in the United States in June 2018, and in Japan in January 2022.
