= CRLF1 =

Protein-coding gene in humans

Identifiers
- Aliases: CRLF1, CISS, CISS1, CLF, CLF-1, NR6, zcytor5, cytokine receptor like factor 1
- External IDs: OMIM: 604237; MGI: 1340030; GeneCards: CRLF1

Gene location (Human)
Chr.	Chromosome 19 (human)
Band	19p13.11	Start	18,572,220 bp
Band	19p13.11	End	18,607,741 bp

Gene location (Mouse)
Chr.	Chromosome 8 (mouse)
Band	8 B3.3|8 34.15 cM	Start	70,945,808 bp
Band	8 B3.3|8 34.15 cM	End	70,956,731 bp
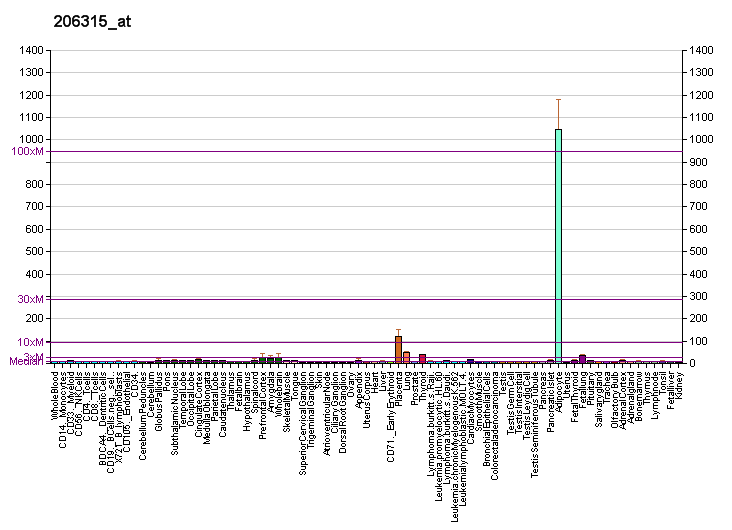
RNA expression pattern
Bgee	Human / Mouse (ortholog); Top expressed in: right coronary artery; popliteal artery; tibial arteries; left coronary artery; thoracic aorta; ascending aorta; right lobe of thyroid gland; decidua; left lobe of thyroid gland; Descending thoracic aorta / Top expressed in: stroma of bone marrow; seminiferous tubule; corneal stroma; maxillary prominence; lower lip; submandibular gland; upper lip; hand; endothelial cell of lymphatic vessel; calvaria; More reference expression data
BioGPS	More reference expression data
Gene ontology
Molecular function	protein heterodimerization activity; ciliary neurotrophic factor receptor binding; cytokine activity; protein binding; cytokine binding; cytokine receptor activity
Cellular component	extracellular region; CRLF-CLCF1 complex; extracellular space; cytosol; external side of plasma membrane; receptor complex
Biological process	negative regulation of neuron apoptotic process; ureteric bud development; positive regulation of cell population proliferation; negative regulation of motor neuron apoptotic process; positive regulation of tyrosine phosphorylation of STAT protein; regulation of signaling receptor activity; cytokine-mediated signaling pathway; interleukin-27-mediated signaling pathway
Sources:Amigo / QuickGO
Orthologs
Databases	NCBI: entry; OMA: entry
Species	Human	Mouse
Entrez	9244	12931
Ensembl	ENSG00000006016	ENSMUSG00000007888
UniProt	O75462	Q9JM58
RefSeq (mRNA)	NM_004750	NM_018827; NM_001378799; NM_001378800; NM_001378801; NM_001378802 NM_001378803
RefSeq (protein)	NP_004741	NP_061297; NP_001365728; NP_001365729; NP_001365730; NP_001365731 NP_001365732
Location (UCSC)	Chr 19: 18.57 – 18.61 Mb	Chr 8: 70.95 – 70.96 Mb
PubMed search
- Wikidata
View/Edit Human	View/Edit Mouse

Cytokine receptor-like factor 1 is a protein that in humans is encoded by the CRLF1 gene.

== Function ==
This gene encodes a member of the cytokine type I receptor family. The protein forms a secreted complex with cardiotrophin-like cytokine factor 1 and acts on cells expressing ciliary neurotrophic factor receptors. The complex can promote survival of neuronal cells.

== Clinical significance ==
Mutations in this gene are associated with two conditions, both rare:

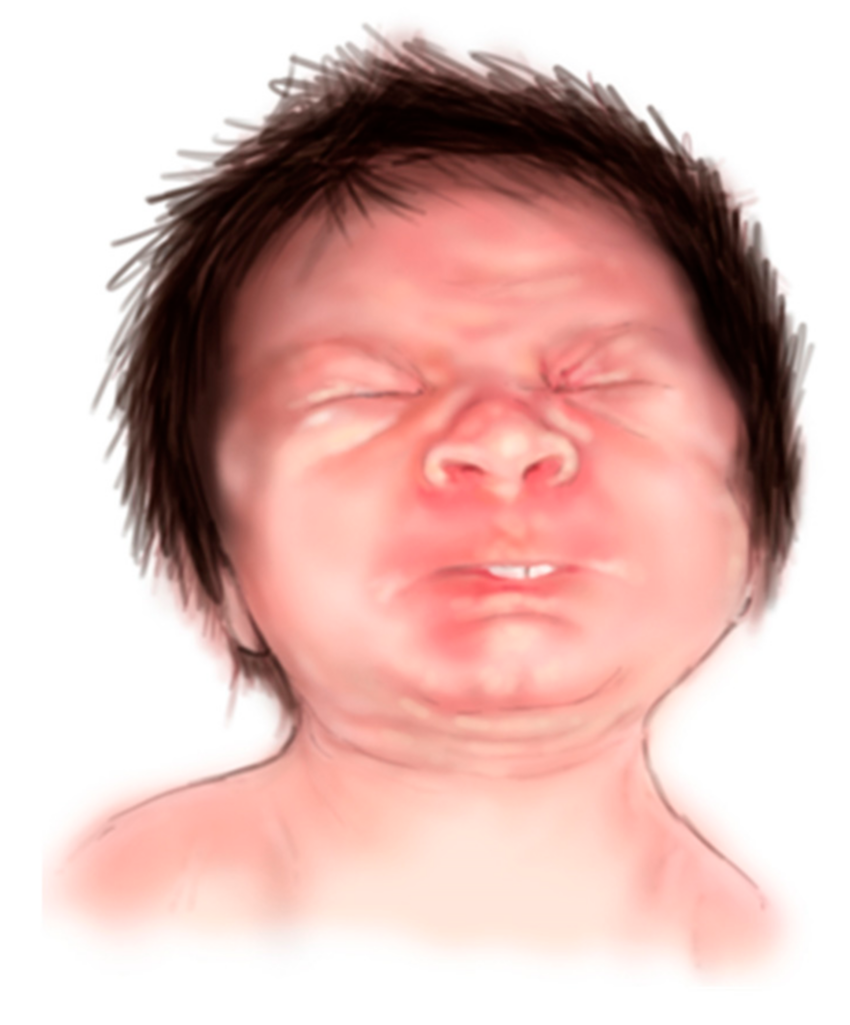
- Illustration of an infant with facial trismus, a common signal of handling or crying in Cold-induced sweating syndrome
  Cold-induced sweating syndrome, characterized by profuse hyperhidrosis in cold environmental temperature and characteristic craniofacial and skeletal features)
- Crisponi syndrome (CS), characterized by neonatal-onset paroxysmal muscular contractions, abnormal function of the autonomic nervous system and craniofacial and skeletal manifestations such as thick and arched eyebrows, a short nose with anteverted nostrils, full cheeks, an inverted upper lip and a small mouth.

It is unknown whether the two conditions are distinct clinical entities or a single clinical entity with variable expressions. Other characteristic features in CRLF1 mutation include marfanoid habitus with progressive kyphoscoliosis and craniofacial characteristics including dolichocephaly, a slender face with poor expression, a nose with hypoplastic nares, malar hypoplasia and prognathism.
