= Łucja Frey =

Polish neurologist

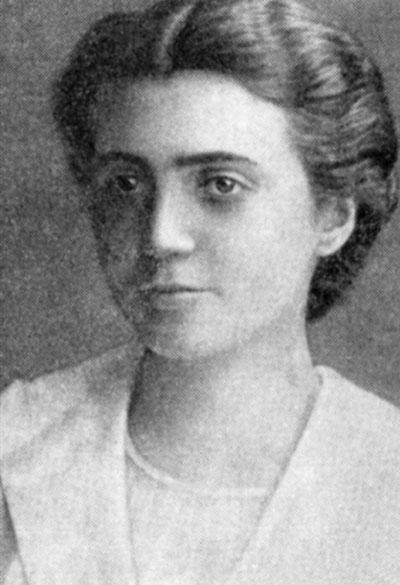
Łucja Frey in 1919

Łucja Frey or Łucja Frey-Gottesman (November 3, 1889, in Lwów – 1942?) was a Polish-Jewish physician and neurologist, known for describing the syndrome later named after her. She was one of the first female academic neurologists in Europe. Frey perished during the Holocaust in 1942 in Lwów Ghetto aged 53.

== Life ==
Łucja Frey was born on November 3, 1889, in Lwów, then part of the Austro-Hungarian empire, as the daughter of the building contractor Szymon Symcha Frey and his wife, Dina (née Weinreb) Frey and her family were Jewish. She attended a Christian elementary school between 1896 and 1900. She graduated from Franciszek-Józef secondary school as an extern pupil in 1907. After graduation she studied mathematics and philosophy under professor Marian Smoluchowski (1872-1917). She was a student of the faculty of philosophy from 1907 to 1912, but after five years she moved to Warsaw and began studying medicine.

Frey studied medicine from 1918 to 1923 and received her medical diploma on June 2, 1923. Her studies were interrupted for one year because of the Polish–Ukrainian War.

After graduation she continued her work as a senior assistant to professor Kazimierz Orzechowski (1878–1942) in his Warsaw neurological clinic. At the end of 1928 she left Warsaw to go back to Lwów, and married a lawyer named Mordechai (Marek) Gottesman (1887 in Komarno – 1941?). From May 1929 she was working at the neurological clinic in Lwów on Rappaporta Street as a deputy senior consultant. She gave birth to her daughter, Danuta, in 1930.

After the Soviet invasion of Poland on September 19, 1939, and the subsequent occupation of Lwów, Marek Gottesman was accused of counter-revolutionary activities and was arrested by the NKVD; nothing is known about him after this point. In 1941, under the German occupation of Lwów, Łucja Frey was resettled to the ghetto and forced to work in Ghettopoliklinik in Zamarstynowska 112. She was probably murdered together with her patients during liquidation of the ghetto in August 1942 or shortly after deportation to Belzec extermination camp. No evidence exists, that she, or any of her relatives, survived.

There are many uncertainties about her life. According to Yad Vashem testimony of Frey's sister-in-law, Hedwa Balat, Łucja and Marek had a son named Jakub, born in 1919. This is most likely Jakub Gottesman, the son of Marek Gottesman with his first wife, Klara Philipp. Jakub was also killed in the Holocaust as was his mother, Klara, and his step-father, Dr. Michal Sokaler.

== Recognition ==
Until 2004, only short biographic articles about Łucja Frey's life existed: in Polish, Swedish, and English. These publications repeated fragmentary and scarce facts from Eufemiusz Herman's classic monograph about Polish neurologists. New facts about her tragic life were published in Mirjam Moltrecht's biography. However, Frey's name is often omitted or misspelled (as "Lucy" or "Lucie") in many textbooks and dictionaries. Dates of birth and death of Austrian physician and physiologist Maximilian Ruppert Franz von Frey (1852-1932) were sometimes mistakenly given as hers.

== Works ==
Diagram of innervation of parotid gland used in Łucja Frey's description of "her" syndrome

Frey's publication about auriculotemporal nerve syndrome, now widely known as "Frey's syndrome" ("zespół Łucji Frey" in Polish), was published in 1923, first in Polish journal "Polska Gazeta Lekarska", and later that year in renowned French journal "Revue Neurologique". It was not the very first description of this constellation of symptoms. Frey's predecessors were Kastremsky (1740), Duphenix (1757), Barthez (1806), Dupuy (1816), Brown-Sequard (1849), Baillarger (1853), Henle (1855), Berard (1855), Bergounhioux (1859), Rouyer (1859), Botkin (1875), Parkes Weber (1897), New and Bozer (1922) and Lipsztat (1922). Both Brown-Sequard and Henle reported their own symptoms. All these observations lack a wide view of the anatomy, pathology and exact mechanism of gustatory sweating. Łucja Frey's article "Przypadek zespołu nerwu usznoskroniowego" ("Le Syndrome du Nerf Auriculo-Temporal") is considered to be the first such description of the phenomenon. Frey was first to recognize this syndrome as a disorder of both sympathetic and parasympathetic innervations.

The eponym "Frey syndrome" was introduced to medical literature by Henryk Higier in 1926 and in 1932 by Bassoe. In recognition of earlier descriptions of this syndrome, it is also sometimes called Baillarger's syndrome, Frey-Baillarger syndrome or Dupuy syndrome.

Besides this important work, Frey published papers on the effects of vegetable poisons on spinal cord degeneration, brain stem topography, amyotrophic lateral sclerosis, Charcot joints, aneurysms of the plexus of the medulla, cysts of brain ventricles, clivus tumors, frontal lobe tumors and retrosplenial tumors.

== Bibliography ==
Full list of Łucja Frey's works (she is the sole author unless otherwise noted):

- Przypadek podrażnienia nerwu usznoskroniowego. Pamiętnik Kliniczny Szpitala Dzieciątka Jezus 8, 1-2 (1923)
- Przypadek zakrzepu tętnicy móżdżkowej. Pamiętnik Kliniczny Szpitala Dzieciątka Jezus 8, 24 (1923)
- Przypadek zespołu bocznej ściany zatoki jamistej (Zespół Feix). Pamiętnik Kliniczny Szpitala Dzieciątka Jezus 8, 8-9 (1923)
- Przypadek zespołu nerwu usznoskroniowego. Polska Gazeta Lekarska 41, 708-710 (1923)
- Le syndrome du nerf auriculo-temporal. Revue Neurologique 2, 2, 97-104 (1923)
- O działaniu jadów wegetatywnych na drżenie włókienkowe w sprawach zanikowych pochodzenia rdzeniowego. Medycyna Doświadczalna i Społeczna 5, 5–6, 379-387 (1925)
- Przyczynki do nauki o topografii w trzonie mózgowym. Ogniska boczne i środkowe w rdzeniu przedłużonym. Neurologia Polska 8, 2, 124-142 (1925)
- Frey Ł, (1925) "Przyczynki do nauki o topografii w trzonie mózgowym. Ogniska w wyższych piętrach mostu Varola." Polska Gazeta Lekarska 15 335–338 (in Polish)
- Przypadek chorego z guzem stoku Blumenbacha. Polska Gazeta Lekarska 14, 328 (1925)
- Przypadek guza stoku Blumenbacha. Pamiętnik Kliniczny Szpitala Dzieciątka Jezus 9, 6-7 (1925)
- Przypadek zapalenia nerwów posurowiczego. Neurologia Polska 8, 340-341 (1925)
- Frey Ł, Orzechowski K. Zmiany anatomiczne w chorobie Charcota. Neurologia Polska 8, 3–4, 196-219 (1925)
- Frey Ł, Orzechowski K. Zmiany anatomiczne w chorobie Charcota. Księga Pamiątkowa XII Zjazdu Lek Przyr 2, 145 (1925-1926)
- O działaniu jadów wegetatywnych na drżenie włókienkowe w sprawach zanikowych pochodzneia rdzeniowego. Księga Pamiątkowa XII Zjazdu Lek Przyr 2, 158 (1925-1926)
- Étude anatomo-pathologique d’un cas d’anévrisme cirsoide de la moelle. Revue Neurologique 1, 709 (1926)
- Pokaz mózgu z torbielą III komory. Warszawskie Czasopismo Lekarskie 14, 192 (1926)
- Preparat torbieli III-ej komory. Polska Gazeta Lekarska 16, 312 (1926)
- Przypadek cierpienia rodzinno-dziedzicznego, dotyczącego głównie kończyn dolnych. Warszawskie Czasopismo Lekarskie 4, 193 (1926)
- Przypadek myelitis. Polska Gazeta Lekarska 50, 955 (1926)
- Przypadek tętniaka splotowatego rdzenia. Neurologia Polska 9, 1–2, 21-30 (1926)
- Przypadek tętniaka splotowatego rdzenia. Nowiny Psych 9, 1–2, 21-28 (1926)
- Frey Ł, Orzechowski K. Sur l’histopathologie de la maladie de Charcot. Revue Neurologique 2, 2, 188 (1926)
- Torbiel III komory. Brak objawów lejkowych przy zupełnym zniszczeniu dna III komory. Nowiny Lekarskie 38, 289-292 (1926)
- Przypadek tętniaka splotowatego rdzenia. Neurologia Polska 10, 3–4, 346-347 (1927)
- Kyste du III ventricule. Destruction totale de la région infundibulaire sans signes dits hypophysiaires. Revue Neurologique 2, 413 (1927)
- Kyste du III ventricule. Destruction totale de la région infundibulaire sans signes dits hypophysiaires. L Encéphale 22, 21-26 (1927)
- Paraplegia spastica heredofamiliris. Neurologia Polska 10, 1, 58 (1927)
- Przypadek: Osteoarthropatiae vertebralis tabidorum. Pamiętnik Kliniczny Szpitala Dzieciątka Jezus 10, 30-32 (1927)
- Frey Ł, Opalski A. Przyczynki kliniczne do studium nad schorzeniami dziedzicznemi układu nerwowego. Polska Gazeta Lekarska 15, 6, 277-280 (1927)
- Rdzeń i preparaty drobnowidzowe z przypadku tętniaka splotowatego rdzenia. Polska Gazeta Lekarska 22, 431 (1927)
- Etude anatomo-clinique d’un cas d’anévrisme cirsoide de la moelle. Pamiętnik I Zjazdu Anatomo-Zoologicznego w Warszawie 98-99 (1927)
- Frey Ł, Orzechowski K. Neurirétinite unilatérale due à une Highmorite du même coté, améliorée après une ponction du sinus maxillaire. Lésions pagétoides dans les os de la voûte crânienne décelées à la radiographie. Revue Neurologique 2, 284 (1927)
- Frey Ł, Drozdowicz. Neuroretinitis jednego oka przy zajęciu jamy Highmor'a tej że strony u osobnika z czaszką Pagetowską. Neurologia Polska 11, 2, 246-248 (1928)
- Przypadek guza retrosplejalnego. Neurologia Polska 11, 3–4, 319-320 (1928)
- Przypadek guza retrosplejalnego. Polska Gazeta Lekarska 14, 261 (1928)
- Przypadek operowanego guza śródbłonka mózgu. Polska Gazeta Lekarska 8, 150 (1928)
- Frey Ł, Sławiński. Przypadek operowany śródbłoniaka płata czołowego. Neurologia Polska 11, 3–4, 312 (1928)
- Przypadek: Osteoarthropatiae vertebralis tabidorum. Neurologia Polska 11, 1, 128-130 (1928)
- Przypadek sympatomatu rdzenia kręgowego. Neurologia Polska 11, 1, 125-127 (1928)
- Przypadek śródbłoniaka płata czołowego wyłuszczonego pomyślnie. Polska Gazeta Lekarska 20, 373-376 (1928)
- Urazowe podrażnienie nerwów promieniowego i mięśniowo-skórnego z przerwaniem kilku ścięgien. Neurologia Polska 11, 3–4, 350-351 (1928)
- Étude anatomo-clinique d’un cas d’anévrisme cirsoide de la moelle épinière. Ann d anat-path 5, 971-979 (1928)
