= Aluminum chloride hexahydrate =

Aluminum chloride hexahydrate, sold under the brand name Hydrosal Gel among others, is a first-line treatment for excessive sweating.

Clinical studies support the efficacy and low incidence of irritation of the 15% aluminum chloride and 2% salicylic acid gel base formula.

== Formulations ==
Hydrosal Gel is a registered trademark of Valeo Pharma Inc. Hydrosal Gel contains 15% Aluminum chloride|aluminum chloride hexahydrate, an ingredient often used in strong antiperspirants, as well as a hydroalcoholic salicylic acid gel base.
