= MiraDry =

Microwave-based medical device used to treat axillary hyperhydrosis

miraDry is a microwave-based medical device developed by Miramar Labs which is used in the treatment of axillary hyperhidrosis. It was approved by the US Food and Drug Administration (FDA) in 2011 and was also approved in Europe. miraDry selectively destroys axillary sweat glands without affecting the superficial layers of the skin. In addition to sweat glands, miraDry destroys hair follicles in the axillary region regardless of hair color. It is about 72.5 to 90% effective and sweat is reduced by about 82% on average. It also reduces axillary hair by about 75%. The effects of miraDry are noticeable almost immediately and are long-lasting or permanent. A case of death due to miraDry caused by necrotizing fasciitis that was complicated by streptococcal toxic shock syndrome has been reported.
