= Perspiration =

Fluid secreted from sudoriferous glands

- Other names: Sweating, hidrosis, diaphoresis
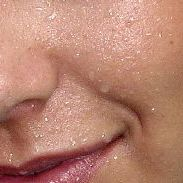
- Droplets of perspiration on the skin
- Specialty: Dermatology
- Symptoms: Body odor
- Complications: Dehydration
- Causes: Exercise; Fever; Heat; Hyperthermia; Hot flash
- Treatment: Antiperspirant

Perspiration, also known as sweat, diaphoresis and hidrosis, is the fluid secreted by sweat glands in the skin of mammals.

Two types of sweat glands can be found in humans: eccrine glands and apocrine glands. The eccrine sweat glands are distributed over much of the body and are responsible for secreting the watery, brackish sweat most often triggered by excessive body temperature. Apocrine sweat glands are restricted to the armpits and a few other areas of the body and produce an odorless, oily, opaque secretion which then gains its characteristic odor from bacterial decomposition.

In humans, sweating is primarily a means of thermoregulation, which is achieved by the water-rich secretion of the eccrine glands. Maximum sweat rates of an adult can be up to 2–4 litres (0.5–1 US gal) per hour or 10–14 litres (2.5–3.5 US gal) per day, but is less in children prior to puberty. Evaporation of sweat from the skin surface has a cooling effect due to evaporative cooling. Hence, in hot weather, or when the individual's muscles heat up due to exertion, more sweat is produced. Animals with few sweat glands, such as dogs, accomplish similar temperature regulation results by panting, which evaporates water from the moist lining of the oral cavity and pharynx.

Although sweating is found in a wide variety of mammals, relatively few (apart from humans, horses, some primates and some bovidae) produce sweat in order to cool down. In horses, such cooling sweat is created by apocrine glands and contains a wetting agent, the protein latherin which transfers from the skin to the surface of their coats.

== Definitions ==
- The words diaphoresis and hidrosis can both mean either perspiration (in which sense they are synonymous with sweating) or excessive perspiration (in which sense they can be either synonymous with hyperhidrosis or differentiable from it only by clinical criteria involved in narrow specialist senses of the words).
- Hypohidrosis is decreased sweating from whatever cause.
- Hyperhidrosis is excessive sweating, usually secondary to an underlying condition (in which case it is called secondary hyperhidrosis) and usually involving the body as a whole (in which case it is called generalized hyperhidrosis).
- Focal hyperhidrosis is increased or excessive sweating in certain regions such as the underarm, palms, soles, face, or groin.
- Hidromeiosis is a reduction in sweating that is due to blockages of sweat glands in humid conditions.
- A substance or medicine that causes perspiration is a sudorific or sudatory.

== Signs and symptoms ==
Sweat contributes to body odor when it is metabolized by bacteria on the skin. Medications that are used for other treatments and diet also affect odor. Some medical conditions, such as kidney failure and diabetic ketoacidosis, can also affect sweat odor.

== Causes ==
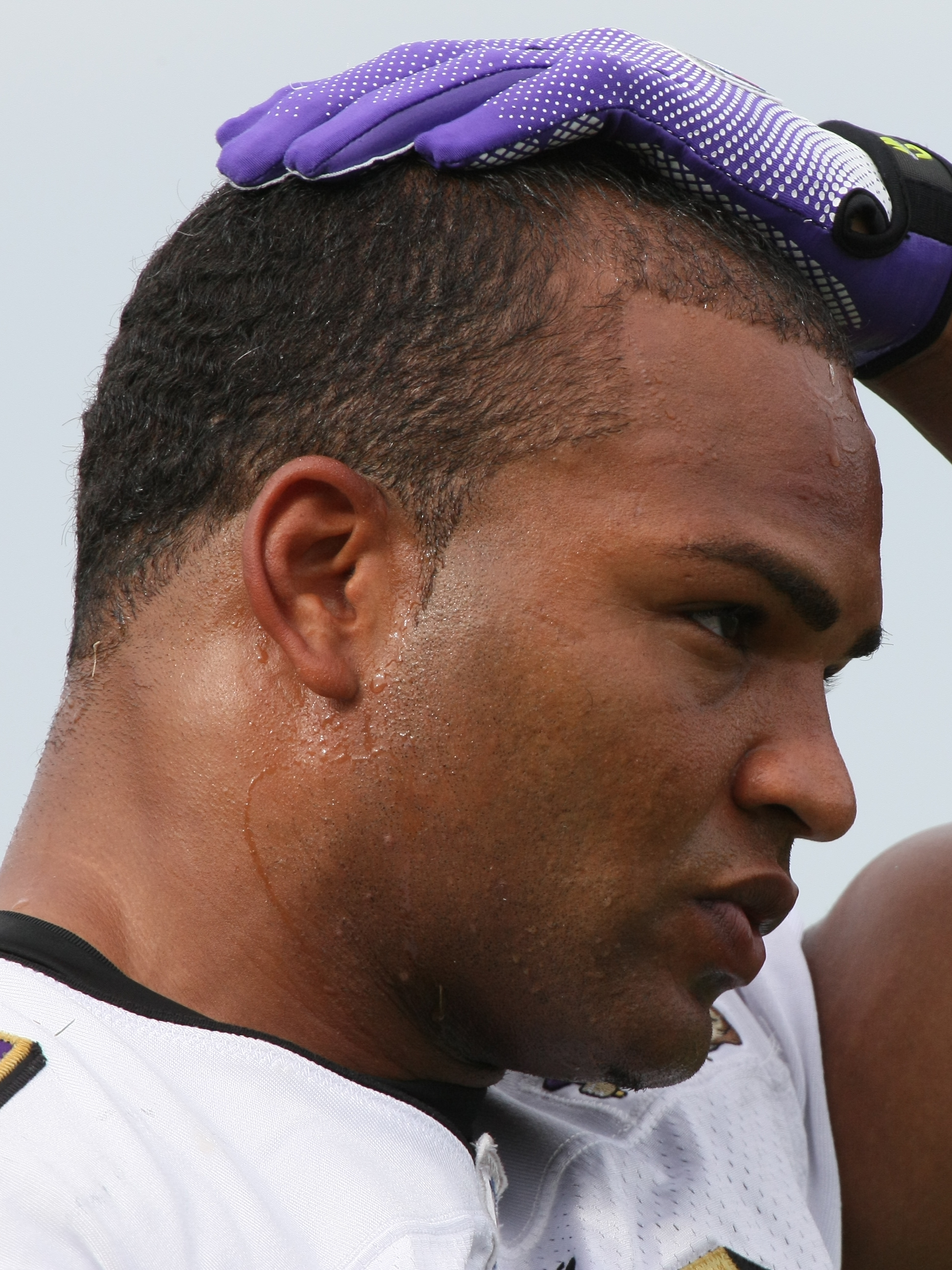
An athlete with sweat on his face after physical exertion.

Diaphoresis is a non-specific symptom or sign, which means that it has many possible causes. Some causes of diaphoresis include physical exertion, menopause, fever, ingestion of toxins or irritants, and high environmental temperature. Strong emotions (anger, fear, anxiety) and recall of past trauma can also trigger sweating. This is sometimes referred to as flop sweat.

The vast majority of sweat glands in the body are innervated by sympathetic cholinergic neurons. Sympathetic postganglionic neurons typically secrete norepinephrine and are named sympathetic adrenergic neurons; however, the sympathetic postganglionic neurons that innervate sweat glands secrete acetylcholine and hence are termed sympathetic cholinergic neurons. Sweat glands, piloerector muscles, and some blood vessels are innervated by sympathetic cholinergic neurons.

=== Pathological sweating and symptoms ===
Diaphoresis may be associated with some abnormal conditions, such as hyperthyroidism and shock. If it is accompanied by unexplained weight loss, fever/chills, or by palpitations, shortness of breath, unconsciousness, fatigue, dizziness, muscle pain, nausea, vomiting, diarrhea, and chest discomfort, it suggests serious illness.

Diaphoresis is also seen in an acute myocardial infarction (heart attack), from the increased firing of the sympathetic nervous system, and is frequent in serotonin syndrome, which can result in serious sickness or even death. Diaphoresis can also be caused by many types of infections, often accompanied by high fever and/or chills which can trigger the result of hyperthermia. Most infections can cause some degree of diaphoresis and it is a very common symptom in some serious infections such as malaria and tuberculosis. In addition, pneumothorax can cause diaphoresis with splinting of the chest wall. Neuroleptic malignant syndrome and other malignant diseases (e.g. leukemias) can also cause diaphoresis.

Diabetics relying on insulin shots or oral medications may have low blood sugar (hypoglycemia), which can also cause diaphoresis.

Drugs (including caffeine, morphine, alcohol, antidepressants and certain antipsychotics) may be causes, as well as withdrawal from alcohol, benzodiazepines, nonbenzodiazepines or narcotic painkiller dependencies. Sympathetic nervous system stimulants such as cocaine and amphetamines have also been associated with diaphoresis. Diaphoresis due to ectopic catecholamine is a classic symptom of a pheochromocytoma, a rare tumor of the adrenal gland. Acetylcholinesterase inhibitors (e.g. some insecticides) also cause contraction of sweat gland smooth muscle leading to diaphoresis. Mercury is well known for its use as a diaphoretic, and was widely used in the 19th and early 20th century by physicians to "purge" the body of an illness. However, due to the high toxicity of mercury, secondary symptoms would manifest, which were erroneously attributed to the former disease that was being treated with mercurials.

Infantile acrodynia (childhood mercury poisoning) is characterized by excessive perspiration. A clinician should immediately consider acrodynia in an afebrile child who is sweating profusely.

Some people can develop a sweat allergy. The allergy is not due to the sweat itself but instead to an allergy-producing protein secreted by bacteria found on the skin. Tannic-acid has been found to suppress the allergic response along with showering.

=== Hyperhidrosis ===
Millions of people are affected by hyperhidrosis, but more than half never receive treatment due to embarrassment, lack of awareness, or lack of concern. While it most commonly affects the armpits, feet, and hands, it is possible for someone to experience this condition over their whole body. The face is another common area for hyperhidrosis to be an issue. Sweating uncontrollably is not always expected and may be embarrassing to people with the condition. It can cause both physiological and emotional problems in patients. It is generally inherited. It is not life-threatening, but it is threatening to a person's quality of life. Treatments for hyperhidrosis include antiperspirants, iontophoresis, and surgical removal of sweat glands. In severe cases, botulinum toxin injections or surgical cutting of nerves that stimulate the excessive sweating (endoscopic thoracic sympathectomy) may be an option.

=== Night sweats ===
Night sweats, also known as nocturnal hyperhidrosis, is the occurrence of excessive sweating during sleep. The person may or may not also perspire excessively while awake.

One of the most common causes of night sweats in women over 40 is the hormonal changes related to menopause and perimenopause. This is a very common occurrence during the menopausal transition years.

While night sweats might be relatively harmless, it can also be a sign of a serious underlying disease. It is important to distinguish night sweats due to medical causes from those that occur simply because the sleep environment is too warm, either because the bedroom is unusually hot or because there are too many covers on the bed. Night sweats caused by a medical condition or infection can be described as "severe hot flashes occurring at night that can drench sleepwear and sheets, which are not related to the environment". Some of the underlying medical conditions and infections that cause these severe night sweats can be life-threatening and should promptly be investigated by a medical practitioner.

== Mechanism ==
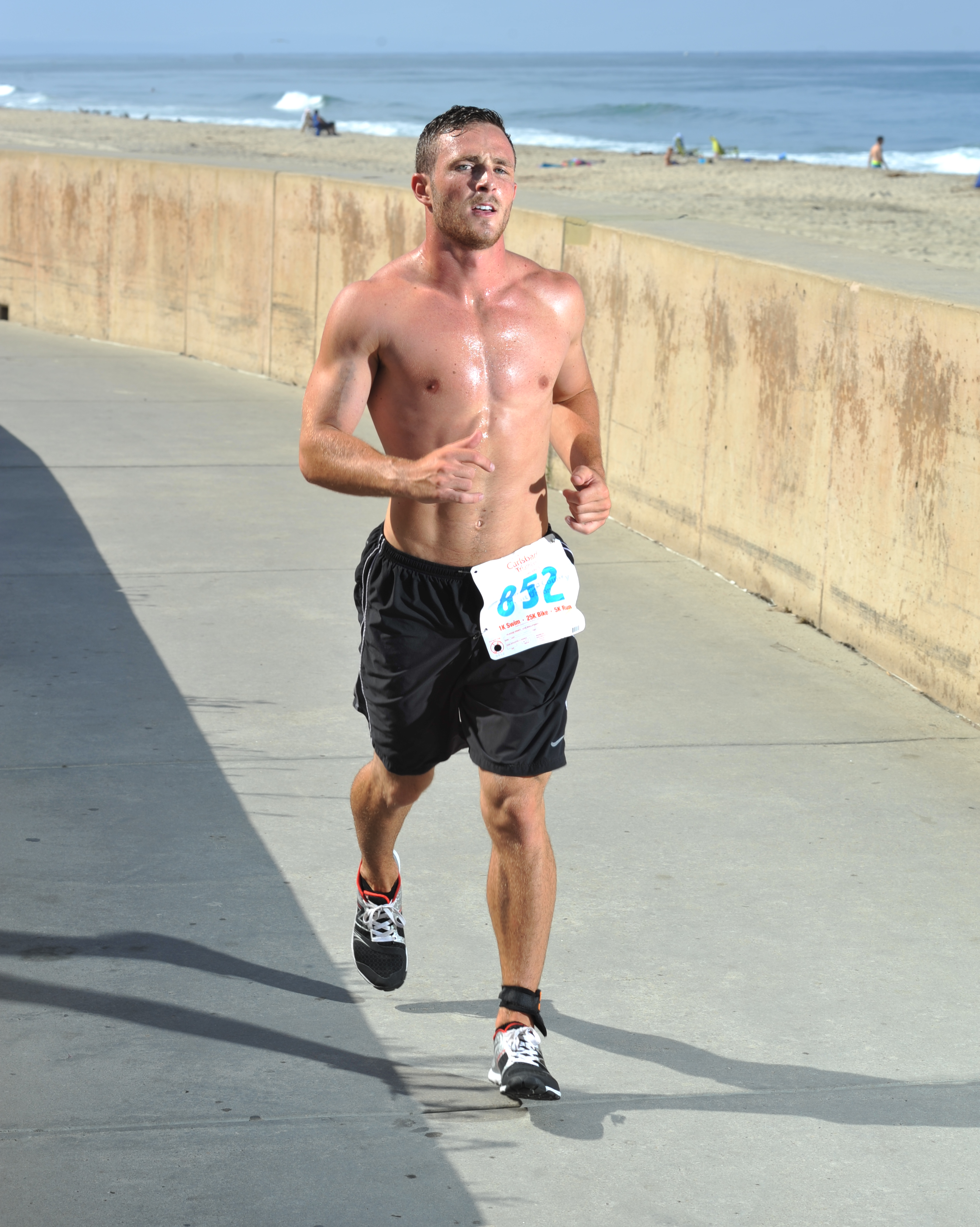
The evaporation of sweat on the skin cools the body.

Sweating allows the body to regulate its temperature. Sweating is controlled from a center in the preoptic and anterior regions of the brain's hypothalamus, where thermosensitive neurons are located. The heat-regulatory function of the hypothalamus is also affected by inputs from temperature receptors in the skin. High skin temperature reduces the hypothalamic set point for sweating and increases the gain of the hypothalamic feedback system in response to variations in core temperature. Overall, however, the sweating response to a rise in hypothalamic ('core') temperature is much larger than the response to the same increase in average skin temperature.

Sweating causes a decrease in core temperature through evaporative cooling at the skin surface. As high energy molecules evaporate from the skin, releasing energy absorbed from the body, the skin and superficial vessels decrease in temperature. Cooled venous blood then returns to the body's core and counteracts rising core temperatures.

There are two situations in which the nerves will stimulate the sweat glands, causing perspiration: during physical heat and during emotional stress. In general, emotionally induced sweating is restricted to palms, soles, armpits, and sometimes the forehead, while physical heat-induced sweating occurs throughout the body.

Human sweat is not pure water; though it contains no protein, it always contains a small amount (0.2–1%) of solute. When a person moves from a cold climate to a hot climate, adaptive changes occur in the sweating mechanisms of the person. This process is referred to as acclimatization: the maximum rate of sweating increases and its solute composition decreases. The volume of water lost in sweat daily is highly variable, ranging from 100 to 8,000 millilitres per day (0.041 to 3.259 imp fl oz/ks). The solute loss can be as much as 350 mmol/d (or 90 mmol/d acclimatised) of sodium under the most extreme conditions. During average intensity exercise, sweat losses can average up to 2 litres (0.44 imp gal; 0.53 US gal) of water/hour. In a cool climate and in the absence of exercise, sodium loss can be very low (less than 5 mmol/d). Sodium concentration in sweat is 30–65 mmol/L, depending on the degree of acclimatisation.

Horses have a thick, waterproofed, hairy coat that would normally block the rapid translocation of sweat water from the skin to the surface of the hair required for evaporative cooling. To solve this, horses have evolved a detergent-like protein, latherin, that they release at high concentrations in their sweat. Their perspiration unlike humans is created by apocrine glands. This protein, by wetting the horses' coat hairs facilitate water flow for cooling evaporation. The presence of this protein can be seen in the lathering that often occurs on the coats of sweating horses, especially when rubbed. In hot conditions, horses during three hours of moderate-intensity exercise can lose 30 to 35 litres (6.6 to 7.7 imp gal; 7.9 to 9.2 US gal) of water and 100 grams (3.5 oz) of sodium, 198 grams (7.0 oz) of chloride and 45 grams (1.6 oz) of potassium.

== Composition ==
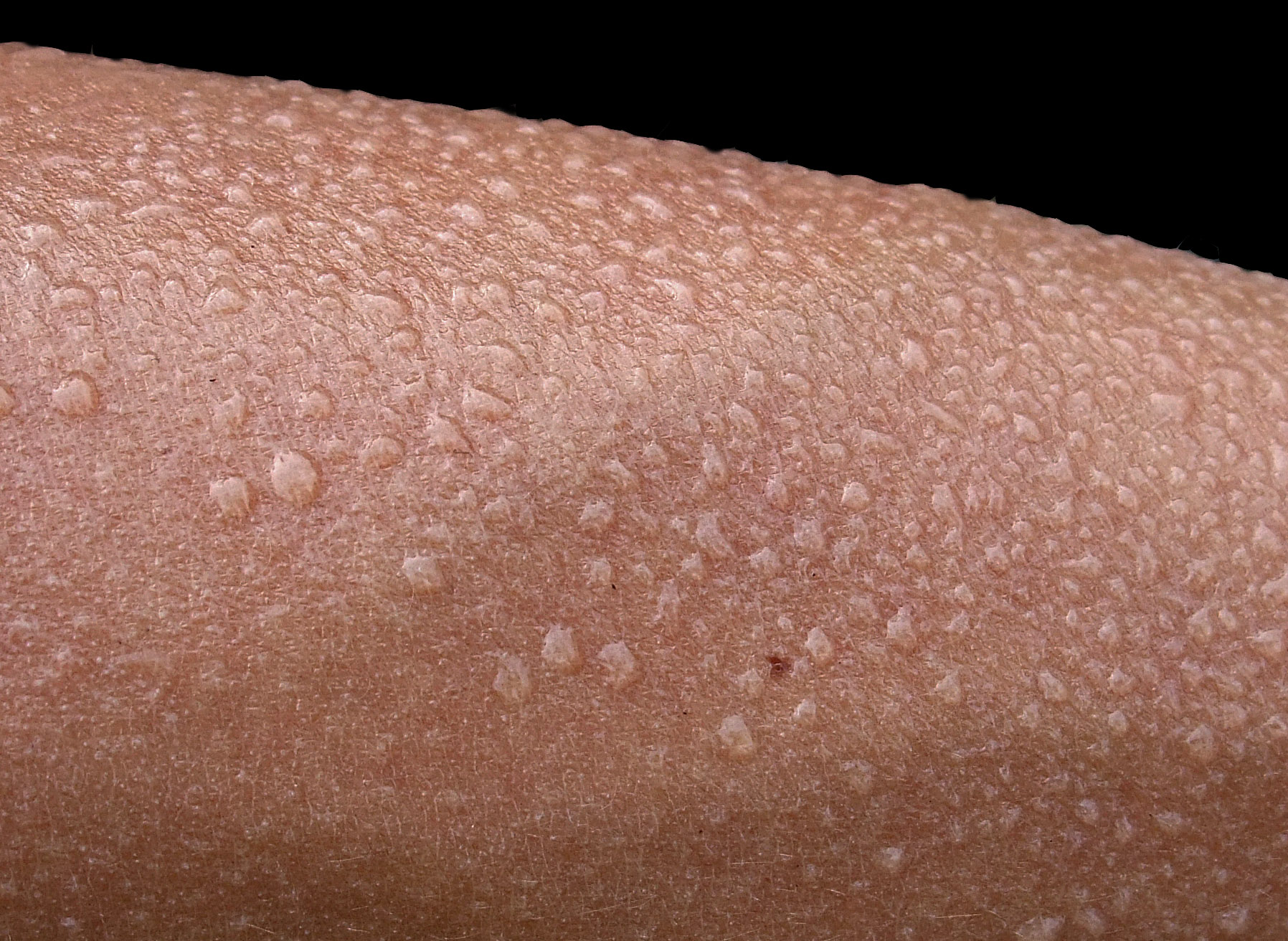
Beads of sweat emerging from eccrine glands

Sweat is mostly water. A microfluidic model of the eccrine sweat gland provides details on what solutes partition into sweat, their mechanisms of partitioning, and their fluidic transport to the skin surface. Dissolved in the water are trace amounts of minerals, lactic acid, and urea. Although the mineral content varies, some measured concentrations are: sodium (0.9 gram/litre), potassium (0.2 g/L), calcium (0.015 g/L), and magnesium (0.0013 g/L).

Relative to the plasma and extracellular fluid, the concentration of Na^{+} ions is much lower in sweat (≈40 mM in sweat versus ≈150 mM in plasma and extracellular fluid). Initially, within eccrine glands sweat has a high concentration of Na^{+} ions. In the sweat ducts, the Na^{+} ions are re-absorbed into tissue by epithelial sodium channels (ENaC) that are located on the apical membrane of epithelial cells that form the duct (see Fig. 9 of the reference).

Many other trace elements are also excreted in sweat, again an indication of their concentration is (although measurements can vary fifteenfold) zinc (0.4 milligrams/litre), copper (0.3–0.8 mg/L), iron (1 mg/L), chromium (0.1 mg/L), nickel (0.05 mg/L), and lead (0.05 mg/L). Probably many other less-abundant trace minerals leave the body through sweating with correspondingly lower concentrations. Some exogenous organic compounds make their way into sweat as exemplified by an unidentified odiferous "maple syrup" scented compound in several of the species in the mushroom genus Lactarius. In humans, sweat is hypoosmotic relative to plasma (i.e. less concentrated). Sweat is found at moderately acidic to neutral pH levels, typically between 4.5 and 7.0.

Sweat contains many glycoproteins.

== Other functions ==
=== Antimicrobial ===
Sweat may serve an antimicrobial function, like that of earwax or other secretory fluids (e.g., tears, saliva, and milk). It does this through a combination of glycoproteins that either bind directly to, or prevent the binding of microbes to, the skin and seem to form part of the innate immune system.

In 2001, researchers at Eberhard-Karls University in Tübingen, Germany, isolated a large protein called dermcidin from skin. This protein, which could be cleaved into other antimicrobial peptides, was shown to be effective at killing some species of bacteria and fungi that affect humans, including Escherichia coli, Enterococcus faecalis, Staphylococcus aureus, and Candida albicans. It was active at high salt concentrations and in the acidity range of human sweat, where it was present at concentrations of 1–10 mg/ml.

== Society and culture ==
=== Artificial perspiration ===
Artificial skin capable of sweating similar to natural sweat rates and with the surface texture and wetting properties of regular skin has been developed for research purposes. Artificial perspiration is also available for in-vitro testing, and contains 16 amino acids and the most abundant minerals and metabolites in sweat.

=== Diagnostics ===
There is interest in its use in wearable technology. Sweat can be sampled and sensed non-invasively and continuously using electronic tattoos, bands, or patches. However, sweat as a diagnostic fluid presents numerous challenges as well, such as very small sample volumes and filtration (dilution) of larger-sized hydrophilic analytes. Currently the only major commercial application for sweat diagnostics is for infant cystic fibrosis testing based on sweat chloride concentrations.

== See also ==
- Apocrine
- Body odor
- Deodorant
- Hidradenitis suppurativa
- Hyperthermia
- Hyponatremia
- Meat sweats
- Miliaria
- Pheromones
- Sweat diagnostics
- Sauna suit
- Transpiration
