= Endoscopic thoracic sympathectomy =

Surgical removal of sympathetic nerves in the thorax

- ICD-9-CM: 05.2
- MedlinePlus: 007291

Endoscopic thoracic sympathectomy (ETS) is a surgical procedure in which a portion of the sympathetic nerve trunk in the thoracic region is destroyed. ETS is used to treat conditions such as excessive sweating in certain parts of the body (focal hyperhidrosis), flushing of the face, Raynaud's disease, and reflex sympathetic dystrophy. The most common indication for ETS treatment is palmar hyperhidrosis (sweaty palms). Like any surgical procedure, it has risks. The endoscopic sympathetic block (ESB) procedure and other procedures which affect fewer nerves are considered to present lower risks.

Sympathectomy physically destroys relevant nerves anywhere in either of the two sympathetic trunks, which are long chains of nerve ganglia located bilaterally along the vertebral column responsible for various important aspects of the peripheral nervous system (PNS). Each nerve trunk is broadly divided into three regions: cervical (neck), thoracic (chest), and lumbar (lower back). The most common area targeted in sympathectomy is the upper thoracic region, that part of the sympathetic chain lying between the first and fifth thoracic vertebrae.

== Indications ==
The most common indications for thoracic sympathectomy are focal hyperhidrosis (that specifically affects the hands and underarms), Raynaud syndrome, and facial blushing when accompanied by focal hyperhidrosis. It may also be used to treat bromhidrosis, although this usually responds to non-surgical treatments, and sometimes people with olfactory reference syndrome present to surgeons requesting sympathectomy.

There are reports of ETS being used to achieve cerebral revascularization for people with moyamoya disease, and to treat headaches, hyperactive bronchial tubes, long QT syndrome, social phobia, anxiety, and other conditions.

== Surgical procedure ==
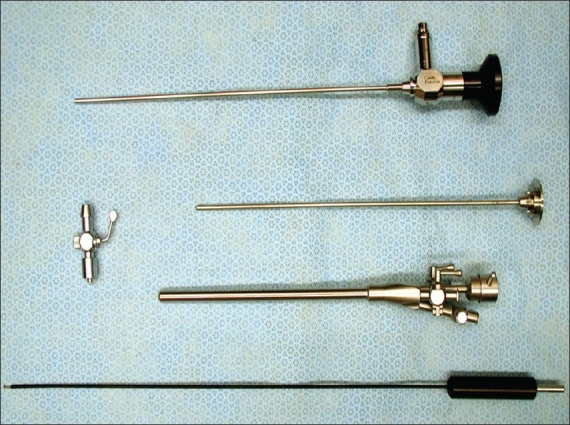
A custom made operating thoracoscope, used for the endoscopic thoracic sympathectomy procedure.

ETS involves dissection of the main sympathetic trunk in the upper thoracic region of the sympathetic nervous system, irreparably disrupting neural messages that ordinarily would travel to many different organs, glands and muscles. It is via those nerves that the brain is able to make adjustments to the body in response to changing conditions in the environment, fluctuating emotional states, level of exercise, and other factors to maintain the body in its ideal state (see homeostasis).

Because these nerves also regulate conditions like excessive blushing or sweating, which the procedure is designed to eliminate, the normative functions these physiological mechanisms perform will be disabled or significantly impaired by sympathectomy.

There is much disagreement among ETS surgeons about the best surgical method, optimal location for nerve dissection, and the nature and extent of the consequent primary effects and side effects. When performed endoscopically as is usually the case, the surgeon penetrates the chest cavity making multiple incisions about the diameter of a straw between ribs. This allows the surgeon to insert the video camera (endoscope) in one hole and a surgical instrument in another. The operation is accomplished by dissecting the nerve tissue of the main sympathetic chain.

Another technique, the clamping method, also referred to as 'endoscopic sympathetic blockade' (ESB) employs titanium clamps around the nerve tissue, and was developed as an alternative to older methods in an unsuccessful attempt to make the procedure reversible. Technical reversal of the clamping procedure must be performed within a short time after clamping (estimated at a few days or weeks at most), and a recovery, evidence indicates, will not be complete.

== Physical, mental and emotional effects ==
Sympathectomy works by disabling part of the autonomic nervous system (and thereby disrupting its signals from the brain), through surgical intervention, in the expectation of removing or alleviating the designated problem. Many non-ETS doctors have found this practice questionable chiefly because its purpose is to destroy functionally disordered, yet anatomically typical nerves.

Exact results of ETS are impossible to predict, because of considerable anatomic variation in nerve function from one patient to the next, and also because of variations in surgical technique. The autonomic nervous system is not anatomically exact and connections might exist which are unpredictably affected when the nerves are disabled. This problem was demonstrated by a significant number of patients who underwent sympathectomy at the same level for hand sweating, but who then presented a reduction or elimination of feet sweating, in contrast to others who were not affected in this way. No reliable operation exists for foot sweating except lumbar sympathectomy, at the opposite end of the sympathetic chain.

Thoracic sympathectomy will change many bodily functions, including sweating, vascular responses, heart rate, heart stroke volume, thyroid, baroreflex, lung volume, pupil dilation, skin temperature and other aspects of the autonomic nervous system, like the essential fight-or-flight response. It reduces the physiological responses to strong emotions, such as fear and laughter, diminishes the body's physical reaction to both pain and pleasure, and inhibits cutaneous sensations such as goose bumps.

A large study of psychiatric patients treated with this surgery showed significant reductions in fear, alertness and arousal. Arousal is essential to consciousness, in regulating attention and information processing, memory and emotion.

ETS patients are being studied using the autonomic failure protocol headed by David Goldstein, M.D. Ph.D., senior investigator at the U.S National Institute of Neurological Disorders and Stroke. He has documented loss of thermoregulatory function, cardiac denervation, and loss of vasoconstriction. Recurrence of the original symptoms due to nerve regeneration or nerve sprouting can occur within the first year post surgery. Nerve sprouting, or abnormal nerve growth after damage or injury to the nerves can cause other further damage. Sprouting sympathetic nerves can form connections with sensory nerves, and lead to pain conditions that are mediated by the SNS. Every time the system is activated, it is translated into pain. This sprouting and its action can lead to Frey's syndrome, a recognized after effect of sympathectomy, when the growing sympathetic nerves innervate salivary glands, leading to excessive sweating regardless of environmental temperature through olfactory or gustatory stimulation.

In addition, patients have reported lethargy, depression, weakness, limb swelling, lack of libido, decreased physical and mental reactivity, oversensitivity to sound, light and stress and weight gain (British Journal of Surgery 2004; 91: 264–269).

== Risks ==
ETS has both the normal risks of surgery, such as bleeding and infection, conversion to open chest surgery, and several specific risks, including permanent and unavoidable alteration of nerve function. It is reported that a number of patients - 9 since 2010, mostly young women - have died during this procedure due to major intrathoracic bleeding and cerebral disruption. Bleeding during and following the operation may be significant in up to 5% of patients. Pneumothorax (collapsed lung) can occur (2% of patients). Compensatory hyperhidrosis (or reflex hyperhidrosis) is common over the long term. The rates of severe compensatory sweating vary widely between studies, ranging from as high as 92% of patients. Of those patients that develop this side effect, about a quarter in one study said it was a major and disabling problem. 35% of people affected have to change their clothes several times a day as a result.

A severe possible consequence of thoracic sympathectomy is corposcindosis (split-body syndrome), in which the patient feels that they are living in two separate bodies, because sympathetic nerve function has been divided into two distinct regions, one dead, and the other hyperactive.

Additionally, the following side effects have all been reported by patients: Chronic muscular pain, numbness and weakness of the limbs, Horner's Syndrome, anhidrosis (inability to sweat), hyperthermia (exacerbated by anhidrosis and systemic thermoregulatory dysfunction), neuralgia, paraesthesia, fatigue and amotivationality, breathing difficulties, substantially diminished physiological/chemical reaction to internal and environmental stimuli, somatosensory malfunction, aberrant physiological reaction to stress and exertion, Raynaud’s disease (albeit a possible indication for surgery), reflex hyperhidrosis, altered/erratic blood pressure and circulation, defective fight or flight response system, loss of adrenaline, eczema and other skin conditions resulting from exceptionally dry skin, rhinitis, gustatory sweating (also known as Frey's syndrome).

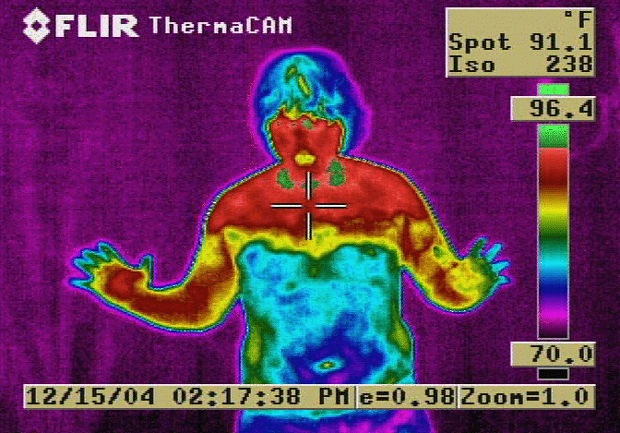
A thermal image of an ETS patient 2 years after surgery.

Other long-term adverse effects include:

- Ultrastructural changes in the cerebral artery wall induced by long-term sympathetic denervation
- Sympathectomy eliminates the psychogalvanic reflex
- Cervical sympathectomy reduces the heterogeneity of oxygen saturation in small cerebrocortical veins
- Sympathetic denervation is one of the causes of Mönckeberg's sclerosis
- T2-3 sympathectomy suppressed baroreflex control of heart rate in the patients with palmar hyperhidrosis. The baroreflex response for maintaining cardiovascular stability is suppressed in the patients who received the ETS.
- Exertional heat stroke.
- Morphofunctional changes in the myocardium following sympathectomy.

Other side effects are the inability to raise the heart rate sufficiently during exercise with instances requiring an artificial pacemaker after developing bradycardia being reported as a consequence of the surgery.

The Finnish Office for Health Care Technology Assessment concluded more than a decade ago in a 400-page systematic review that ETS is associated with an unusually high number of significant immediate and long-term adverse effects.

Quoting the Swedish National Board of Health and Welfare statement: "The method can give permanent side effects that in some cases will first become obvious only after some time. One of the side effects might be increased perspiration on different places on your body. Why and how this happens is still unknown. According to the research available about 25-75% of all patients can expect more or less serious perspiration on different places on their body, such as the trunk and groin area, this is Compensatory sweating".

In 2003, ETS was banned in its birthplace, Sweden, due to inherent risks, and complaints by disabled patients. In 2004, Taiwanese health authorities banned the procedure on people under 20 years of age.

== History ==
Sympathectomy developed in the mid-19th century, when it was learned that the autonomic nervous system runs to almost every organ, gland and muscle system in the body. It was surmised that these nerves play a role in how the body regulates many different body functions in response to changes in the external environment, and in emotion.

The first sympathectomy was performed by Alexander in 1889. Thoracic sympathectomy has been indicated for hyperhidrosis (excessive sweating) since 1920, when Kotzareff showed it would cause anhidrosis (total inability to sweat) from the nipple line upwards.

A lumbar sympathectomy was also developed and used to treat excessive sweating of the feet and other ailments, and typically resulted in impotence and retrograde ejaculation in men. Lumbar sympathectomy is still being offered as a treatment for plantar hyperhidrosis, or as a treatment for patients who have a bad outcome (extreme 'compensatory sweating') after thoracic sympathectomy for palmar hyperhidrosis or blushing; however, extensive sympathectomy risks hypotension.

Endoscopic sympathectomy itself is relatively easy to perform; however, accessing the nerve tissue in the chest cavity by conventional surgical methods was difficult, painful, and spawned several different approaches in the past. The posterior approach was developed in 1908, and required resection (sawing off) of ribs. A supraclavicular (above the collar-bone) approach was developed in 1935, which was less painful than the posterior, but was more prone to damaging delicate nerves and blood vessels. Because of these difficulties, and because of disabling sequelae associated with sympathetic denervation, conventional or "open" sympathectomy was never a popular procedure, although it continued to be practiced for hyperhidrosis, Raynaud's disease, and various psychiatric disorders. With the brief popularization of lobotomy in the 1940s, sympathectomy fell out of favor as a form of psychosurgery.

The endoscopic version of thoracic sympathectomy was pioneered by Goren Claes and Christer Drott in Sweden in the late 1980s. The development of endoscopic "minimally invasive" surgical techniques has decreased the recovery time from the surgery and increased its availability. Today, ETS surgery is practiced in many countries throughout the world predominantly by vascular surgeons.

== See also ==
- Harlequin syndrome
