= Focal hyperhidrosis =

Excessive sweating in certain body regions

- Other names: primary hyperhidrosis
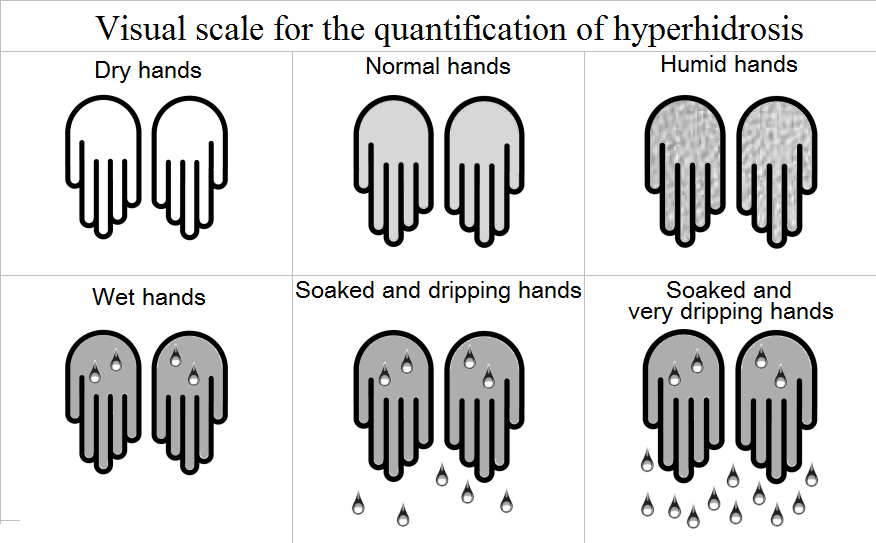

Focal hyperhidrosis, also known as primary hyperhidrosis, is a disease characterized by an excessive sweating localized in certain body regions (particularly palms, feet and underarms). Studies suggest that this condition, affecting between 1% and 3% of the US population, seems to have a genetic predisposition in about two thirds of those affected.

Focal hyperhidrosis is sometimes referred to as The Silent Handicap, as it has a significant impact on the quality of life, affecting the individual socially, psychologically, emotionally and professionally.

== Genetics ==
In 2006, researchers uncovered that primary palmar hyperhidrosis, referring to excess sweating on the palms of the hands and feet, maps to the gene locus 14q11.2-q13.

Based on previous research using mice and rats, researchers looked towards the role of aquaporin 5 (AQP5), a water channel protein, in human individuals with primary focal hyperhidrosis. AQP5 has been identified as a candidate gene in many hyperhidrosis studies. Using a family that had members with primary focal hyperhidrosis, researchers found that there was no connection between primary focal hyperhidrosis and AQP5. There was also no significant connection between the gene 14q11.2-q13 locus, which was linked to primary palmar hyperhidrosis, and primary focal hyperhidrosis in this family.

The expression of the AQP5 protein and AQP5 mRNA was significantly higher in a patient group in comparison to the control group. In 2011, using a control group (individuals without primary focal hyperhidrosis) and a patient group (individuals with primary focal hyperhidrosis) researchers found that there was no difference between the number of sweat coils in the axillary sweat glands. This indicates that there is nothing morphologically different between individuals with and without primary focal hyperhidrosis. The discrepancies between the studies above call on further studies to confirm or deny the role of AQP5, and the role of other proteins, in hyperhidrosis.

Beyond looking at the genes and individual proteins that play a role in primary focal hyperhidrosis, researchers have looked at the patterns of heredity for this trait. In a 2003 study, using multiple families, researchers found that primary focal hyperhidrosis was not a sex-linked gene, since male-to-male transmission was seen in multiple families. Instead evidence supported an autosomal dominant pattern of inheritance with an incomplete disease penetrance. 21 patients in this study reported a positive family history of hyperhidrosis (62%). Researchers were able to uncover this by creating pedigrees of all the participants in the study. Not every member of the pedigree exhibited forms of hyperhidrosis, which allowed the researchers to track the patterns of inheritance. The findings in this study indicated that primary focal hyperhidrosis is typically an hereditary disorder.

== Diagnosis ==
Typical regions of excessive sweating include the hand palms, underarms, the sole of the foot, and sometimes groin, face, and scalp. Indeed, profuse sweating is present mostly in the underarms, followed by the feet, palms and facial region.

Evidence demonstrates that a positive family history is also present (see the Genetics part).

== Treatments ==
The Canadian Hyperhidrosis Advisory Committee has published a comprehensive set of guidelines which outlines key aspects of treatment related to this condition. Topical hyperhidrosis gels containing aluminum chloride hexahydrate are usually first choice treatments for this condition.

In addition to topical antiperspirants (whose main active ingredients usually are aluminum or zirconium salts) treatment options include: iontophoresis (hands, feet), onabotulinumtoxinA (Botox) injections (underarms, hands, feet, and other localized areas), electromagnetic/microwave energy thermolysis of underarm sweat glands (miraDry), laser-assisted removal of the sweat glands (underarms), other local procedures such as liposuction and curettage of the sweat glands (underarms), medications of the anticholinergic type that are taken by mouth, and sympathectomy surgery for sweating of the hands or head that can't be controlled by other means.

Sofpironium bromide is approved for the treatment of primary axillary hyperhidrosis.
